The Confederate States of America (CSA), commonly referred to as the Confederate States or the Confederacy, was an unrecognized breakaway herrenvolk republic in the Southern United States that existed from February 8, 1861, to May 9, 1865. The Confederacy comprised U.S. states that declared secession and warred against the United States during the American Civil War: South Carolina, Mississippi, Florida, Alabama, Georgia, Louisiana, Texas, Virginia, Arkansas, Tennessee, and North Carolina. 

The Confederacy was formed on February 8, 1861, by seven slave states: South Carolina, Mississippi, Florida, Alabama, Georgia, Louisiana, and Texas. All seven were in the Deep South region of the United States, whose economy was heavily dependent upon agriculture—particularly cotton—and a plantation system that relied upon enslaved Americans of African descent for labor. Convinced that white supremacy and slavery were threatened by the November 1860 election of Abraham Lincoln to the U.S. presidency on a platform that opposed the expansion of slavery into the western territories, the seven slave states seceded from the United States, with the loyal states becoming known as the Union during the ensuing American Civil War. In the Cornerstone Speech, Confederate Vice President Alexander H. Stephens described its ideology as centrally based "upon the great truth that the negro is not equal to the white man; that slavery, subordination to the superior race, is his natural and normal condition."

Before Lincoln took office on March 4, 1861, a provisional Confederate government was established on February 8, 1861. It was considered illegal by the United States federal government, and Northerners thought of the Confederates as traitors. After war began in April, four slave states of the Upper South—Virginia, Arkansas, Tennessee, and North Carolina—also joined the Confederacy. Four slave states — Delaware, Maryland, Kentucky, and Missouri — remained in the Union and became known as the border states. The Confederacy nevertheless recognized two of them — Missouri and Kentucky — as members, accepting rump state assembly declarations of secession as authorization for full delegations of representatives and senators in the Confederate Congress; In the early part of the war the Confederacy controlled and governed more than half of Kentucky and the southern portion of Missouri, but they were never substantially controlled by Confederate forces after 1862, despite the efforts of Confederate shadow governments, which were eventually defeated and expelled from both states. The Union rejected the claims of secession as illegitimate, while the Confederacy fully recognized them.

The Civil War began on April 12, 1861, when the Confederates attacked Fort Sumter, a Union fort in the harbor of Charleston, South Carolina. No foreign government ever recognized the Confederacy as an independent country, although Great Britain and France granted it belligerent status, which allowed Confederate agents to contract with private concerns for weapons and other supplies. By 1865, the Confederacy's civilian government dissolved into chaos: the Confederate States Congress adjourned sine die, effectively ceasing to exist as a legislative body on March 18. After four years of heavy fighting, nearly all Confederate land and naval forces either surrendered or otherwise ceased hostilities by May 1865. The war lacked a clean end, with Confederate forces surrendering or disbanding sporadically throughout most of 1865. The most significant capitulation was Confederate general Robert E. Lee's surrender to Ulysses S. Grant at Appomattox on April 9, after which any doubt about the war's outcome or the Confederacy's survival was extinguished, although another large army under Confederate general Joseph E. Johnston did not formally surrender to William T. Sherman until April 26. Contemporaneously, President Lincoln was assassinated by Confederate sympathizer John Wilkes Booth on April 15. Confederate President Jefferson Davis's administration declared the Confederacy dissolved on May 5, and acknowledged in later writings that the Confederacy "disappeared" in 1865. On May 9, 1865, U.S. president Andrew Johnson officially called an end to the armed resistance in the South.

After the war, Confederate states were readmitted to the Congress during the Reconstruction era, after each ratified the 13th Amendment to the U.S. Constitution outlawing slavery. Lost Cause ideology, an idealized view of the Confederacy valiantly fighting for a just cause, emerged in the decades after the war among former Confederate generals and politicians, as well as organizations such as the United Daughters of the Confederacy and the Sons of Confederate Veterans. Intense periods of Lost Cause activity developed around the turn of the 20th century, and during the civil rights movement of the 1950s and 1960s in reaction to growing support for racial equality. Advocates sought to ensure future generations of Southern whites would continue to support white supremacist policies such as the Jim Crow laws through activities such as building Confederate monuments and influencing textbooks to write on Lost Cause ideology. The modern display of Confederate flags primarily started during the 1948 presidential election, when the battle flag was used by the Dixiecrats. During the   Civil Rights Movement, segregationists used it for demonstrations.

Span of control
 
On February 22, 1862, the Confederate States Constitution of seven state signatories – Mississippi, South Carolina, Florida, Alabama, Georgia, Louisiana, and Texas – replaced the Provisional Constitution of February 8, 1861, with one stating in its preamble a desire for a "permanent federal government". Four additional slave-holding states – Virginia, Arkansas, Tennessee, and North Carolina – declared their secession and joined the Confederacy following a call by U.S. President Abraham Lincoln for troops from each state to recapture Sumter and other seized federal properties in the South.

Missouri and Kentucky were represented by partisan factions adopting the forms of state governments without control of substantial territory or population in either case. The antebellum state governments in both maintained their representation in the Union. Also fighting for the Confederacy were two of the "Five Civilized Tribes" – the Choctaw and the Chickasaw – in Indian Territory, and a new, but uncontrolled, Confederate Territory of Arizona. Efforts by certain factions in Maryland to secede were halted by federal imposition of martial law; Delaware, though of divided loyalty, did not attempt it. A Unionist government was formed in opposition to the secessionist state government in Richmond and administered the western parts of Virginia that had been occupied by Federal troops. The Restored Government of Virginia later recognized the new state of West Virginia, which was admitted to the Union during the war on June 20, 1863, and relocated to Alexandria for the rest of the war.

Confederate control over its claimed territory and population in congressional districts steadily shrank from three-quarters to a third during the American Civil War due to the Union's successful overland campaigns, its control of inland waterways into the South, and its blockade of the southern coast. With the Emancipation Proclamation on January 1, 1863, the Union made abolition of slavery a war goal (in addition to reunion). As Union forces moved southward, large numbers of plantation slaves were freed. Many joined the Union lines, enrolling in service as soldiers, teamsters and laborers. The most notable advance was Sherman's "March to the Sea" in late 1864. Much of the Confederacy's infrastructure was destroyed, including telegraphs, railroads, and bridges. Plantations in the path of Sherman's forces were severely damaged. Internal movement within the Confederacy became increasingly difficult, weakening its economy and limiting army mobility.

These losses created an insurmountable disadvantage in men, materiel, and finance. Public support for Confederate President Jefferson Davis's administration eroded over time due to repeated military reverses, economic hardships, and allegations of autocratic government. After four years of campaigning, Richmond was captured by Union forces in April 1865. A few days later General Robert E. Lee surrendered to Union General Ulysses S. Grant, effectively signaling the collapse of the Confederacy. President Davis was captured on May 10, 1865, and jailed for treason, but no trial was ever held.

History

The Confederacy was established by the Montgomery Convention in February 1861 by seven states (South Carolina, Mississippi, Alabama, Florida, Georgia, Louisiana, adding Texas in March before Lincoln's inauguration), expanded in May–July 1861 (with Virginia, Arkansas, Tennessee, North Carolina), and disintegrated in April–May 1865. It was formed by delegations from seven slave states of the Lower South that had proclaimed their secession from the Union. After the fighting began in April, four additional slave states seceded and were admitted. Later, two slave states (Missouri and Kentucky) and two territories were given seats in the Confederate Congress.

Southern nationalism was rising and pride supported the new founding. Confederate nationalism prepared men to fight for "The Southern Cause". For the duration of its existence, the Confederacy underwent trial by war. The Southern Cause transcended the ideology of states' rights, tariff policy, and internal improvements. This "Cause" supported, or derived from, cultural and financial dependence on the South's slavery-based economy. The convergence of race and slavery, politics, and economics raised almost all South-related policy questions to the status of moral questions over way of life, merging love of things Southern and hatred of things Northern. Not only did political parties split, but national churches and interstate families as well divided along sectional lines as the war approached. According to historian John M. Coski,

Southern Democrats had chosen John Breckinridge as their candidate during the U.S. presidential election of 1860, but in no Southern state (other than South Carolina, where the legislature chose the electors) was support for him unanimous, as all of the other states recorded at least some popular votes for one or more of the other three candidates (Abraham Lincoln, Stephen A. Douglas and John Bell). Support for these candidates, collectively, ranged from significant to an outright majority, with extremes running from 25% in Texas to 81% in Missouri. There were minority views everywhere, especially in the upland and plateau areas of the South, being particularly concentrated in western Virginia and eastern Tennessee.

Following South Carolina's unanimous 1860 secession vote, no other Southern states considered the question until 1861, and when they did none had a unanimous vote. All had residents who cast significant numbers of Unionist votes in either the legislature, conventions, popular referendums, or in all three. Voting to remain in the Union did not necessarily mean that individuals were sympathizers with the North. Once fighting began, many of these who voted to remain in the Union, particularly in the Deep South, accepted the majority decision, and supported the Confederacy.

Many writers have evaluated the Civil War as an American tragedy—a "Brothers' War", pitting "brother against brother, father against son, kin against kin of every degree".

A revolution in disunion

According to historian Avery O. Craven in 1950, the Confederate States of America nation, as a state power, was created by secessionists in Southern slave states, who believed that the federal government was making them second-class citizens. They judged the agents of change to be abolitionists and anti-slavery elements in the Republican Party, whom they believed used repeated insult and injury to subject them to intolerable "humiliation and degradation". The "Black Republicans" (as the Southerners called them) and their allies soon dominated the U.S. House, Senate, and Presidency. On the U.S. Supreme Court, Chief Justice Roger B. Taney (a presumed supporter of slavery) was 83 years old and ailing.

During the campaign for president in 1860, some secessionists threatened disunion should Lincoln (who opposed the expansion of slavery into the territories) be elected, including William L. Yancey. Yancey toured the North calling for secession as Stephen A. Douglas toured the South calling for union if Lincoln was elected. To the secessionists the Republican intent was clear: to contain slavery within its present bounds and, eventually, to eliminate it entirely. A Lincoln victory presented them with a momentous choice (as they saw it), even before his inauguration – "the Union without slavery, or slavery without the Union".

Causes of secession

The immediate catalyst for secession was the victory of the Republican Party and the election of Abraham Lincoln as president in the 1860 elections. American Civil War historian James M. McPherson suggested that, for Southerners, the most ominous feature of the Republican victories in the congressional and presidential elections of 1860 was the magnitude of those victories: Republicans captured over 60 percent of the Northern vote and three-fourths of its Congressional delegations. The Southern press said that such Republicans represented the anti-slavery portion of the North, "a party founded on the single sentiment ... of hatred of African slavery", and now the controlling power in national affairs. The "Black Republican party" could overwhelm the status of white supremacy in the South. The New Orleans Delta said of the Republicans, "It is in fact, essentially, a revolutionary party" to overthrow slavery. By 1860, sectional disagreements between North and South concerned primarily the status of slavery in the United States. The specific question at issue was whether slavery would be permitted to expand into the western territories, leading to more slave states, or be prevented from doing so, which was widely believed would place slavery on a course of ultimate extinction. Historian Drew Gilpin Faust observed that "leaders of the secession movement across the South cited slavery as the most compelling reason for southern independence". Although most white Southerners did not own slaves, the majority supported the institution of slavery and benefited indirectly from the slave society. For struggling yeomen and subsistence farmers, the slave society provided a large class of people ranked lower in the social scale than themselves. Secondary differences related to issues of free speech, runaway slaves, expansion into Cuba, and states' rights. 

Historian Emory Thomas assessed the Confederacy's self-image by studying correspondence sent by the Confederate government in 1861–62 to foreign governments. He found that Confederate diplomacy projected multiple contradictory self-images:

The Cornerstone Speech is frequently cited in analysis surrounding Confederate ideology. In it, Confederate Vice President Alexander H. Stephens declared that the "cornerstone" of the new government "rest[ed] upon the great truth that the negro is not equal to the white man; that slavery – subordination to the superior race – is his natural and normal condition. This, our new government, is the first, in the history of the world, based upon this great physical, philosophical, and moral truth". Stephens' speech criticized "most" of the Founding Fathers for their views on slavery, accusing them of erroneously assuming that races are equal. He declared that disagreements over the enslavement of African Americans were the "immediate cause" of secession and that the Confederate constitution had resolved such issues. Stephens contended that advances and progress in the sciences proved that the Declaration of Independence's view that "all men are created equal" was erroneous, while stating that the Confederacy was the first country in the world founded on the principle of white supremacy and that chattel slavery coincided with the Bible's teachings. After the Confederacy's defeat at the hands of the U.S. in the Civil War and the abolition of slavery, he attempted to retroactively deny and retract the opinions he had stated in the speech. Denying his earlier statements that slavery was the Confederacy's cause for leaving the Union, he contended to the contrary that he thought that the war was rooted in constitutional differences; this explanation by Stephens is widely rejected by historians.

Four of the seceding states, the Deep South states of South Carolina,
Mississippi, Georgia, and Texas, issued formal declarations of the causes of their decision; each identified the threat to slaveholders' rights as the cause of, or a major cause of, secession. Georgia also claimed a general Federal policy of favoring Northern over Southern economic interests. Texas mentioned slavery 21 times, but also listed the failure of the federal government to live up to its obligations, in the original annexation agreement, to protect settlers along the exposed western frontier. Texas resolutions further stated that governments of the states and the nation were established "exclusively by the white race, for themselves and their posterity". They also stated that although equal civil and political rights applied to all white men, they did not apply to those of the "African race", further opining that the end of racial enslavement would "bring inevitable calamities upon both [races] and desolation upon the fifteen slave-holding states".

Alabama did not provide a separate declaration of causes. Instead, the Alabama ordinance stated "the election of Abraham Lincoln ... by a sectional party, avowedly hostile to the domestic institutions and to the peace and security of the people of the State of Alabama, preceded by many and dangerous infractions of the Constitution of the United States by many of the States and people of the northern section, is a political wrong of so insulting and menacing a character as to justify the people of the State of Alabama in the adoption of prompt and decided measures for their future peace and security". The ordinance invited "the slaveholding States of the South, who may approve such purpose, in order to frame a provisional as well as a permanent Government upon the principles of the Constitution of the United States" to participate in a February 4, 1861 convention in Montgomery, Alabama.

The secession ordinances of the remaining two states, Florida and Louisiana, simply declared their severing ties with the federal Union, without stating any causes. Afterward, the Florida secession convention formed a committee to draft a declaration of causes, but the committee was discharged before completion of the task. Only an undated, untitled draft remains.

Four of the Upper South states (Virginia, Arkansas, Tennessee, and North Carolina) rejected secession until after the clash at Ft. Sumter. Virginia's ordinance stated a kinship with the slave-holding states of the Lower South, but did not name the institution itself as a primary reason for its course.

Arkansas's secession ordinance encompassed a strong objection to the use of military force to preserve the Union as its motivating reason. Before the outbreak of war, the Arkansas Convention had on March 20 given as their first resolution: "The people of the Northern States have organized a political party, purely sectional in its character, the central and controlling idea of which is hostility to the institution of African slavery, as it exists in the Southern States; and that party has elected a President ... pledged to administer the Government upon principles inconsistent with the rights and subversive of the interests of the Southern States."

North Carolina and Tennessee limited their ordinances to simply withdrawing, although Tennessee went so far as to make clear they wished to make no comment at all on the "abstract doctrine of secession".

In a message to the Confederate Congress on April 29, 1861, Jefferson Davis cited both the tariff and slavery for the South's secession.

Secessionists and conventions
The pro-slavery "Fire-Eaters" group of Southern Democrats, calling for immediate secession, were opposed by two factions. "Cooperationists" in the Deep South would delay secession until several states left the union, perhaps in a Southern Convention. Under the influence of men such as Texas Governor Sam Houston, delay would have the effect of sustaining the Union. "Unionists", especially in the Border South, often former Whigs, appealed to sentimental attachment to the United States. Southern Unionists' favorite presidential candidate was John Bell of Tennessee, sometimes running under an "Opposition Party" banner.

Many secessionists were active politically. Governor William Henry Gist of South Carolina corresponded secretly with other Deep South governors, and most southern governors exchanged clandestine commissioners. Charleston's secessionist "1860 Association" published over 200,000 pamphlets to persuade the youth of the South. The most influential were: "The Doom of Slavery" and "The South Alone Should Govern the South", both by John Townsend of South Carolina; and James D. B. De Bow's "The Interest of Slavery of the Southern Non-slaveholder".

Developments in South Carolina started a chain of events. The foreman of a jury refused the legitimacy of federal courts, so Federal Judge Andrew Magrath ruled that U.S. judicial authority in South Carolina was vacated. A mass meeting in Charleston celebrating the Charleston and Savannah railroad and state cooperation led to the South Carolina legislature to call for a Secession Convention. U.S. Senator James Chesnut, Jr. resigned, as did Senator James Henry Hammond.

Elections for Secessionist conventions were heated to "an almost raving pitch, no one dared dissent", according to historian William W. Freehling. Even once–respected voices, including the Chief Justice of South Carolina, John Belton O'Neall, lost election to the Secession Convention on a Cooperationist ticket. Across the South mobs expelled Yankees and (in Texas) executed German-Americans suspected of loyalty to the United States. Generally, seceding conventions which followed did not call for a referendum to ratify, although Texas, Arkansas, and Tennessee did, as well as Virginia's second convention. Kentucky declared neutrality, while Missouri had its own civil war until the Unionists took power and drove the Confederate legislators out of the state.

Attempts to thwart secession
In the antebellum months, the Corwin Amendment was an unsuccessful attempt by the Congress to bring the seceding states back to the Union and to convince the border slave states to remain. It was a proposed amendment to the United States Constitution by Ohio Congressman Thomas Corwin that would shield "domestic institutions" of the states (which in 1861 included slavery) from the constitutional amendment process and from abolition or interference by Congress.

It was passed by the 36th Congress on March 2, 1861. The House approved it by a vote of 133 to 65 and the United States Senate adopted it, with no changes, on a vote of 24 to 12. It was then submitted to the state legislatures for ratification. In his inaugural address Lincoln endorsed the proposed amendment.

The text was as follows:

Had it been ratified by the required number of states prior to 1865, it would have made institutionalized slavery immune to the constitutional amendment procedures and to interference by Congress.

Inauguration and response

The first secession state conventions from the Deep South sent representatives to meet at the Montgomery Convention in Montgomery, Alabama, on February 4, 1861. There the fundamental documents of government were promulgated, a provisional government was established, and a representative Congress met for the Confederate States of America.

The new 'provisional' Confederate President Jefferson Davis issued a call for 100,000 men from the various states' militias to defend the newly formed Confederacy. All Federal property was seized, along with gold bullion and coining dies at the U.S. mints in Charlotte, North Carolina; Dahlonega, Georgia; and New Orleans. The Confederate capital was moved from Montgomery to Richmond, Virginia, in May 1861. On February 22, 1862, Davis was inaugurated as president with a term of six years.

The newly inaugurated Confederate administration pursued a policy of national territorial integrity, continuing earlier state efforts in 1860 and early 1861 to remove U.S. government presence from within their boundaries. These efforts included taking possession of U.S. courts, custom houses, post offices, and most notably, arsenals and forts. But after the Confederate attack and capture of Fort Sumter in April 1861, Lincoln called up 75,000 of the states' militia to muster under his command. The stated purpose was to re-occupy U.S. properties throughout the South, as the U.S. Congress had not authorized their abandonment. The resistance at Fort Sumter signaled his change of policy from that of the Buchanan Administration. Lincoln's response ignited a firestorm of emotion. The people of both North and South demanded war, with soldiers rushing to their colors in the hundreds of thousands. Four more states (Virginia, North Carolina, Tennessee, and Arkansas) refused Lincoln's call for troops and declared secession, while Kentucky maintained an uneasy "neutrality".

Secession
Secessionists argued that the United States Constitution was a contract among sovereign states that could be abandoned at any time without consultation and that each state had a right to secede. After intense debates and statewide votes, seven Deep South cotton states passed secession ordinances by February 1861 (before Abraham Lincoln took office as president), while secession efforts failed in the other eight slave states. Delegates from those seven formed the CSA in February 1861, selecting Jefferson Davis as the provisional president. Unionist talk of reunion failed and Davis began raising a 100,000 man army.

States
Initially, some secessionists may have hoped for a peaceful departure. Moderates in the Confederate Constitutional Convention included a provision against importation of slaves from Africa to appeal to the Upper South. Non-slave states might join, but the radicals secured a two-thirds requirement in both houses of Congress to accept them.

Seven states declared their secession from the United States before Lincoln took office on March 4, 1861. After the Confederate attack on Fort Sumter April 12, 1861, and Lincoln's subsequent call for troops on April 15, four more states declared their secession:

Kentucky declared neutrality but after Confederate troops moved in, the state government asked for Union troops to drive them out. The splinter Confederate state government relocated to accompany western Confederate armies and never controlled the state population. By the end of the war, 90,000 Kentuckians had fought on the side of the Union, compared to 35,000 for the Confederate States.

In Missouri, a constitutional convention was approved and delegates elected by voters. The convention rejected secession 89–1 on March 19, 1861. The governor maneuvered to take control of the St. Louis Arsenal and restrict Federal movements. This led to confrontation, and in June Federal forces drove him and the General Assembly from Jefferson City. The executive committee of the constitutional convention called the members together in July. The convention declared the state offices vacant, and appointed a Unionist interim state government. The exiled governor called a rump session of the former General Assembly together in Neosho and, on October 31, 1861, passed an ordinance of secession. It is still a matter of debate as to whether a quorum existed for this vote. The Confederate state government was unable to control very much Missouri territory. It had its capital first at Neosho, then at Cassville, before being driven out of the state. For the remainder of the war, it operated as a government in exile at Marshall, Texas.

Neither Kentucky nor Missouri was declared in rebellion in Lincoln's Emancipation Proclamation. The Confederacy recognized the pro-Confederate claimants in both Kentucky (December 10, 1861) and Missouri (November 28, 1861) and laid claim to those states, granting them Congressional representation and adding two stars to the Confederate flag. Voting for the representatives was mostly done by Confederate soldiers from Kentucky and Missouri.

The order of secession resolutions and dates are:

1. South Carolina (December 20, 1860)
2. Mississippi (January 9, 1861)
3. Florida (January 10)
4. Alabama (January 11)
5. Georgia (January 19)
6. Louisiana (January 26)
7. Texas (February 1; referendum February 23)
 Inauguration of President Lincoln, March 4
 Bombardment of Fort Sumter (April 12) and President Lincoln's call-up (April 15)

8. Virginia (April 17; referendum May 23, 1861)
9. Arkansas (May 6)
10. Tennessee (May 7; referendum June 8)
11. North Carolina (May 20)

In Virginia, the populous counties along the Ohio and Pennsylvania borders rejected the Confederacy. Unionists held a Convention in Wheeling in June 1861, establishing a "restored government" with a rump legislature, but sentiment in the region remained deeply divided. In the 50 counties that would make up the state of West Virginia, voters from 24 counties had voted for disunion in Virginia's May 23 referendum on the ordinance of secession. In the 1860 Presidential election "Constitutional Democrat" Breckenridge had outpolled "Constitutional Unionist" Bell in the 50 counties by 1,900 votes, 44% to 42%. Regardless of scholarly disputes over election procedures and results county by county, altogether they simultaneously supplied over 20,000 soldiers to each side of the conflict. Representatives for most of the counties were seated in both state legislatures at Wheeling and at Richmond for the duration of the war.

Attempts to secede from the Confederacy by some counties in East Tennessee were checked by martial law. Although slave-holding Delaware and Maryland did not secede, citizens from those states exhibited divided loyalties. Regiments of Marylanders fought in Lee's Army of Northern Virginia. But overall, 24,000 men from Maryland joined the Confederate armed forces, compared to 63,000 who joined Union forces.

Delaware never produced a full regiment for the Confederacy, but neither did it emancipate slaves as did Missouri and West Virginia. District of Columbia citizens made no attempts to secede and through the war years, referendums sponsored by President Lincoln approved systems of compensated emancipation and slave confiscation from "disloyal citizens".

Territories

Citizens at Mesilla and Tucson in the southern part of New Mexico Territory formed a secession convention, which voted to join the Confederacy on March 16, 1861, and appointed Dr. Lewis S. Owings as the new territorial governor. They won the Battle of Mesilla and established a territorial government with Mesilla serving as its capital. The Confederacy proclaimed the Confederate Arizona Territory on February 14, 1862, north to the 34th parallel. Marcus H. MacWillie served in both Confederate Congresses as Arizona's delegate. In 1862, the Confederate New Mexico Campaign to take the northern half of the U.S. territory failed and the Confederate territorial government in exile relocated to San Antonio, Texas.

Confederate supporters in the trans-Mississippi west also claimed portions of the Indian Territory after the United States evacuated the federal forts and installations. Over half of the American Indian troops participating in the Civil War from the Indian Territory supported the Confederacy; troops and one general were enlisted from each tribe. On July 12, 1861, the Confederate government signed a treaty with both the Choctaw and Chickasaw Indian nations. After several battles, Union armies took control of the territory.

The Indian Territory never formally joined the Confederacy, but it did receive representation in the Confederate Congress. Many Indians from the Territory were integrated into regular Confederate Army units. After 1863, the tribal governments sent representatives to the Confederate Congress: Elias Cornelius Boudinot representing the Cherokee and Samuel Benton Callahan representing the Seminole and Creek. The Cherokee Nation aligned with the Confederacy. They practiced and supported slavery, opposed abolition, and feared their lands would be seized by the Union. After the war, the Indian territory was disestablished, their black slaves were freed, and the tribes lost some of their lands.

Capitals

Montgomery, Alabama, served as the capital of the Confederate States of America from February 4 until May 29, 1861, in the Alabama State Capitol. Six states created the Confederate States of America there on February 8, 1861. The Texas delegation was seated at the time, so it is counted in the "original seven" states of the Confederacy; it had no roll call vote until after its referendum made secession "operative". Two sessions of the Provisional Congress were held in Montgomery, adjourning May 21. The Permanent Constitution was adopted there on March 12, 1861.

The permanent capital provided for in the Confederate Constitution called for a state cession of a ten-miles square (100 square mile) district to the central government. Atlanta, which had not yet supplanted Milledgeville, Georgia, as its state capital, put in a bid noting its central location and rail connections, as did Opelika, Alabama, noting its strategically interior situation, rail connections and nearby deposits of coal and iron.

Richmond, Virginia, was chosen for the interim capital at the Virginia State Capitol. The move was used by Vice President Stephens and others to encourage other border states to follow Virginia into the Confederacy. In the political moment it was a show of "defiance and strength". The war for Southern independence was surely to be fought in Virginia, but it also had the largest Southern military-aged white population, with infrastructure, resources, and supplies required to sustain a war. The Davis Administration's policy was that, "It must be held at all hazards."

The naming of Richmond as the new capital took place on May 30, 1861, and the last two sessions of the Provisional Congress were held in the new capital. The Permanent Confederate Congress and President were elected in the states and army camps on November 6, 1861. The First Congress met in four sessions in Richmond from February 18, 1862, to February 17, 1864. The Second Congress met there in two sessions, from May 2, 1864, to March 18, 1865.

As war dragged on, Richmond became crowded with training and transfers, logistics and hospitals. Prices rose dramatically despite government efforts at price regulation. A movement in Congress led by Henry S. Foote of Tennessee argued for moving the capital from Richmond. At the approach of Federal armies in mid-1862, the government's archives were readied for removal. As the Wilderness Campaign progressed, Congress authorized Davis to remove the executive department and call Congress to session elsewhere in 1864 and again in 1865. Shortly before the end of the war, the Confederate government evacuated Richmond, planning to relocate farther south. Little came of these plans before Lee's surrender at Appomattox Court House, Virginia on April 9, 1865. Davis and most of his cabinet fled to Danville, Virginia, which served as their headquarters for eight days.

Diplomacy

United States, a foreign power
During the four years of its existence under trial by war, the Confederate States of America asserted its independence and appointed dozens of diplomatic agents abroad. None were ever officially recognized by a foreign government. The United States government regarded the Southern states as being in rebellion or insurrection and so refused any formal recognition of their status.

Even before Fort Sumter, U.S. Secretary of State William H. Seward issued formal instructions to the American minister to Britain, Charles Francis Adams:

Seward instructed Adams that if the British government seemed inclined to recognize the Confederacy, or even waver in that regard, it was to receive a sharp warning, with a strong hint of war:

The United States government never declared war on those "kindred and countrymen" in the Confederacy, but conducted its military efforts beginning with a presidential proclamation issued April 15, 1861. It called for troops to recapture forts and suppress what Lincoln later called an "insurrection and rebellion".

Mid-war parleys between the two sides occurred without formal political recognition, though the laws of war predominantly governed military relationships on both sides of uniformed conflict.

On the part of the Confederacy, immediately following Fort Sumter the Confederate Congress proclaimed that "war exists between the Confederate States and the Government of the United States, and the States and Territories thereof". A state of war was not to formally exist between the Confederacy and those states and territories in the United States allowing slavery, although Confederate Rangers were compensated for destruction they could effect there throughout the war.

Concerning the international status and nationhood of the Confederate States of America, in 1869 the United States Supreme Court in  ruled Texas' declaration of secession was legally null and void. Jefferson Davis, former President of the Confederacy, and Alexander H. Stephens, its former vice-president, both wrote postwar arguments in favor of secession's legality and the international legitimacy of the Government of the Confederate States of America, most notably Davis' The Rise and Fall of the Confederate Government.

International diplomacy
Once war with the United States began, the Confederacy pinned its hopes for survival on military intervention by Great Britain and/or France. The Confederate government sent James M. Mason to London and John Slidell to Paris. On their way to Europe in 1861, the U.S. Navy intercepted their ship, the Trent, and forcibly took them to Boston, an international episode known as the Trent Affair. The diplomats were eventually released and continued their voyage to Europe. However, their mission was unsuccessful; historians give them low marks for their poor diplomacy. Neither secured diplomatic recognition for the Confederacy, much less military assistance.

The Confederates who had believed that "cotton is king", that is, that Britain had to support the Confederacy to obtain cotton, proved mistaken. The British had stocks to last over a year and had been developing alternative sources of cotton, most notably India and Egypt. Britain had so much cotton that it was exporting some to France. England was not about to go to war with the U.S. to acquire more cotton at the risk of losing the large quantities of food imported from the North.

Aside from the purely economic questions, there was also the clamorous ethical debate. Great Britain took pride in being a leader in ending the transatlantic enslavement of Africans; phasing the practice out within its empire starting in 1833, and deploying the Royal Navy to patrol the waters of the middle passage to prevent additional slave ships from reaching the Western Hemisphere. Confederate diplomats found little support for American slavery, cotton trade or not. A series of slave narratives about American slavery was being published in London. It was in London that the first World Anti-Slavery Convention had been held in 1840; it was followed by regular smaller conferences. A string of eloquent and sometimes well-educated Negro abolitionist speakers crisscrossed not just England but Scotland and Ireland as well. In addition to exposing the reality of America's shameful and sinful chattel slavery—some were fugitive slaves—they rebutted the Confederate position that negroes were "unintellectual, timid, and dependent", and "not equal to the white man...the superior race," as it was put by Confederate Vice-president Alexander H. Stephens in his famous Cornerstone Speech. Frederick Douglass, Henry Highland Garnet, Sarah Parker Remond, her brother Charles Lenox Remond, James W. C. Pennington, Martin Delany, Samuel Ringgold Ward, and William G. Allen all spent years in Britain, where fugitive slaves were safe and, as Allen said, there was an "absence of prejudice against color. Here the colored man feels himself among friends, and not among enemies". One speaker alone, William Wells Brown, gave more than 1,000 lectures on the shame of American chattel slavery.

Throughout the early years of the war, British foreign secretary Lord John Russell, Emperor Napoleon III of France, and, to a lesser extent, British Prime Minister Lord Palmerston, showed interest in recognition of the Confederacy or at least mediation of the war. British Chancellor of the Exchequer William Gladstone, convinced of the necessity of intervention on the Confederate side based on the successful diplomatic intervention in Second Italian War of Independence against Austria, attempted unsuccessfully to convince Lord Palmerston to intervene. By September 1862 the Union victory at the Battle of Antietam, Lincoln's preliminary Emancipation Proclamation and abolitionist opposition in Britain put an end to these possibilities. The cost to Britain of a war with the U.S. would have been high: the immediate loss of American grain-shipments, the end of British exports to the U.S., and the seizure of billions of pounds invested in American securities. War would have meant higher taxes in Britain, another invasion of Canada, and full-scale worldwide attacks on the British merchant fleet. Outright recognition would have meant certain war with the United States. In mid-1862, fears of a race war (as had transpired in the Haitian Revolution of 1791–1804) led to the British considering intervention for humanitarian reasons. Lincoln's Emancipation Proclamation did not lead to interracial violence, let alone a bloodbath, but it did give the friends of the Union strong talking points in the arguments that raged across Britain.

John Slidell, the Confederate States emissary to France, did succeed in negotiating a loan of $15,000,000 from Erlanger and other French capitalists. The money went to buy ironclad warships, as well as military supplies that came in with blockade runners. The British government did allow the construction of blockade runners in Britain; they were owned and operated by British financiers and ship owners; a few were owned and operated by the Confederacy. The British investors' goal was to get highly profitable cotton.

Several European nations maintained diplomats in place who had been appointed to the U.S., but no country appointed any diplomat to the Confederacy. Those nations recognized the Union and Confederate sides as belligerents. In 1863 the Confederacy expelled European diplomatic missions for advising their resident subjects to refuse to serve in the Confederate army. Both Confederate and Union agents were allowed to work openly in British territories. Some state governments in northern Mexico negotiated local agreements to cover trade on the Texas border. The Confederacy appointed Ambrose Dudley Mann as special agent to the Holy See on September 24, 1863. But the Holy See never released a formal statement supporting or recognizing the Confederacy. In November 1863, Mann met Pope Pius IX in person and received a letter supposedly addressed "to the Illustrious and Honorable Jefferson Davis, President of the Confederate States of America"; Mann had mistranslated the address. In his report to Richmond, Mann claimed a great diplomatic achievement for himself, asserting the letter was "a positive recognition of our Government". The letter was indeed used in propaganda, but Confederate Secretary of State Judah P. Benjamin told Mann it was "a mere inferential recognition, unconnected with political action or the regular establishment of diplomatic relations" and thus did not assign it the weight of formal recognition.

Nevertheless, the Confederacy was seen internationally as a serious attempt at nationhood, and European governments sent military observers, both official and unofficial, to assess whether there had been a de facto establishment of independence. These observers included Arthur Lyon Fremantle of the British Coldstream Guards, who entered the Confederacy via Mexico, Fitzgerald Ross of the Austrian Hussars, and Justus Scheibert of the Prussian Army. European travelers visited and wrote accounts for publication. Importantly in 1862, the Frenchman Charles Girard's Seven months in the rebel states during the North American War testified "this government ... is no longer a trial government ... but really a normal government, the expression of popular will".
Fremantle went on to write in his book Three Months in the Southern States that he had

French Emperor Napoleon III assured Confederate diplomat John Slidell that he would make "direct proposition" to Britain for joint recognition. The Emperor made the same assurance to British Members of Parliament John A. Roebuck and John A. Lindsay. Roebuck in turn publicly prepared a bill to submit to Parliament June 30 supporting joint Anglo-French recognition of the Confederacy. "Southerners had a right to be optimistic, or at least hopeful, that their revolution would prevail, or at least endure." Following the double disasters at Vicksburg and Gettysburg in July 1863, the Confederates "suffered a severe loss of confidence in themselves", and withdrew into an interior defensive position. There would be no help from the Europeans.

By December 1864, Davis considered sacrificing slavery in order to enlist recognition and aid from Paris and London; he secretly sent Duncan F. Kenner to Europe with a message that the war was fought solely for "the vindication of our rights to self-government and independence" and that "no sacrifice is too great, save that of honor". The message stated that if the French or British governments made their recognition conditional on anything at all, the Confederacy would consent to such terms. Davis's message could not explicitly acknowledge that slavery was on the bargaining table due to still-strong domestic support for slavery among the wealthy and politically influential. European leaders all saw that the Confederacy was on the verge of total defeat.

Cuba and Brazil
The Confederacy's biggest foreign policy successes were with Cuba and Brazil. Militarily this meant little during the war. Brazil represented the "peoples most identical to us in Institutions", in which slavery remained legal until the 1880s. Cuba was a Spanish colony and the Captain–General of Cuba declared in writing that Confederate ships were welcome, and would be protected in Cuban ports. They were also welcome in Brazilian ports; slavery was legal throughout Brazil, and the abolitionist movement was small. After the end of the war, Brazil was the primary destination of those Southerners who wanted to continue living in a slave society, where, as one immigrant remarked, slaves were cheap (see Confederados). Historians speculate that if the Confederacy had achieved independence, it probably would have tried to acquire Cuba as a base of expansion.

Confederacy at war

Motivations of soldiers

Most soldiers who joined Confederate national or state military units joined voluntarily. Perman (2010) says historians are of two minds on why millions of soldiers seemed so eager to fight, suffer and die over four years:

Military strategy
Civil War historian E. Merton Coulter wrote that for those who would secure its independence, "The Confederacy was unfortunate in its failure to work out a general strategy for the whole war". Aggressive strategy called for offensive force concentration. Defensive strategy sought dispersal to meet demands of locally minded governors. The controlling philosophy evolved into a combination "dispersal with a defensive concentration around Richmond". The Davis administration considered the war purely defensive, a "simple demand that the people of the United States would cease to war upon us". Historian James M. McPherson is a critic of Lee's offensive strategy: "Lee pursued a faulty military strategy that ensured Confederate defeat".

As the Confederate government lost control of territory in campaign after campaign, it was said that "the vast size of the Confederacy would make its conquest impossible". The enemy would be struck down by the same elements which so often debilitated or destroyed visitors and transplants in the South. Heat exhaustion, sunstroke, endemic diseases such as malaria and typhoid would match the destructive effectiveness of the Moscow winter on the invading armies of Napoleon.

Early in the war both sides believed that one great battle would decide the conflict; the Confederates won a surprise victory at the First Battle of Bull Run, also known as First Manassas (the name used by Confederate forces). It drove the Confederate people "insane with joy"; the public demanded a forward movement to capture Washington, relocate the Confederate capital there, and admit Maryland to the Confederacy. A council of war by the victorious Confederate generals decided not to advance against larger numbers of fresh Federal troops in defensive positions. Davis did not countermand it. Following the Confederate incursion into Maryland halted at the Battle of Antietam in October 1862, generals proposed concentrating forces from state commands to re-invade the north. Nothing came of it. Again in mid-1863 at his incursion into Pennsylvania, Lee requested that Davis Beauregard simultaneously attack Washington with troops taken from the Carolinas. But the troops there remained in place during the Gettysburg Campaign.

The eleven states of the Confederacy were outnumbered by the North about four-to-one in military manpower. It was overmatched far more in military equipment, industrial facilities, railroads for transport, and wagons supplying the front.

Confederates slowed the Yankee invaders, at heavy cost to the Southern infrastructure. The Confederates burned bridges, laid land mines in the roads, and made harbors inlets and inland waterways unusable with sunken mines (called "torpedoes" at the time). Coulter reports:

The Confederacy relied on external sources for war materials. The first came from trade with the enemy. "Vast amounts of war supplies" came through Kentucky, and thereafter, western armies were "to a very considerable extent" provisioned with illicit trade via Federal agents and northern private traders. But that trade was interrupted in the first year of war by Admiral Porter's river gunboats as they gained dominance along navigable rivers north–south and east–west. Overseas blockade running then came to be of "outstanding importance". On April 17, President Davis called on privateer raiders, the "militia of the sea", to wage war on U.S. seaborne commerce. Despite noteworthy effort, over the course of the war the Confederacy was found unable to match the Union in ships and seamanship, materials and marine construction.

An inescapable obstacle to success in the warfare of mass armies was the Confederacy's lack of manpower, and sufficient numbers of disciplined, equipped troops in the field at the point of contact with the enemy. During the winter of 1862–63, Lee observed that none of his famous victories had resulted in the destruction of the opposing army. He lacked reserve troops to exploit an advantage on the battlefield as Napoleon had done. Lee explained, "More than once have most promising opportunities been lost for want of men to take advantage of them, and victory itself had been made to put on the appearance of defeat, because our diminished and exhausted troops have been unable to renew a successful struggle against fresh numbers of the enemy."

Armed forces

The military armed forces of the Confederacy comprised three branches: Army, Navy and Marine Corps.

The Confederate military leadership included many veterans from the United States Army and United States Navy who had resigned their Federal commissions and were appointed to senior positions. Many had served in the Mexican–American War (including Robert E. Lee and Jefferson Davis), but some such as Leonidas Polk (who graduated from West Point but did not serve in the Army) had little or no experience.

The Confederate officer corps consisted of men from both slave-owning and non-slave-owning families. The Confederacy appointed junior and field grade officers by election from the enlisted ranks. Although no Army service academy was established for the Confederacy, some colleges (such as The Citadel and Virginia Military Institute) maintained cadet corps that trained Confederate military leadership. A naval academy was established at Drewry's Bluff, Virginia in 1863, but no midshipmen graduated before the Confederacy's end.

Most soldiers were white males aged between 16 and 28. The median year of birth was 1838, so half the soldiers were 23 or older by 1861. In early 1862, the Confederate Army was allowed to disintegrate for two months following expiration of short-term enlistments. Most of those in uniform would not re-enlist following their one-year commitment, so on April 16, 1862, the Confederate Congress enacted the first mass conscription on the North American continent. (The U.S. Congress followed a year later on March 3, 1863, with the Enrollment Act.) Rather than a universal draft, the initial program was a selective service with physical, religious, professional and industrial exemptions. These were narrowed as the war progressed. Initially substitutes were permitted, but by December 1863 these were disallowed. In September 1862 the age limit was increased from 35 to 45 and by February 1864, all men under 18 and over 45 were conscripted to form a reserve for state defense inside state borders. By March 1864, the Superintendent of Conscription reported that all across the Confederacy, every officer in constituted authority, man and woman, "engaged in opposing the enrolling officer in the execution of his duties". Although challenged in the state courts, the Confederate State Supreme Courts routinely rejected legal challenges to conscription.

Many thousands of slaves served as personal servants to their owner, or were hired as laborers, cooks, and pioneers. Some freed blacks and men of color served in local state militia units of the Confederacy, primarily in Louisiana and South Carolina, but their officers deployed them for "local defense, not combat". Depleted by casualties and desertions, the military suffered chronic manpower shortages. In early 1865, the Confederate Congress, influenced by the public support by General Lee, approved the recruitment of black infantry units. Contrary to Lee's and Davis's recommendations, the Congress refused "to guarantee the freedom of black volunteers". No more than two hundred black combat troops were ever raised.

Raising troops

The immediate onset of war meant that it was fought by the "Provisional" or "Volunteer Army". State governors resisted concentrating a national effort. Several wanted a strong state army for self-defense. Others feared large "Provisional" armies answering only to Davis. When filling the Confederate government's call for 100,000 men, another 200,000 were turned away by accepting only those enlisted "for the duration" or twelve-month volunteers who brought their own arms or horses.

It was important to raise troops; it was just as important to provide capable officers to command them. With few exceptions the Confederacy secured excellent general officers. Efficiency in the lower officers was "greater than could have been reasonably expected". As with the Federals, political appointees could be indifferent. Otherwise, the officer corps was governor-appointed or elected by unit enlisted. Promotion to fill vacancies was made internally regardless of merit, even if better officers were immediately available.

Anticipating the need for more "duration" men, in January 1862 Congress provided for company level recruiters to return home for two months, but their efforts met little success on the heels of Confederate battlefield defeats in February. Congress allowed for Davis to require numbers of recruits from each governor to supply the volunteer shortfall. States responded by passing their own draft laws.

The veteran Confederate army of early 1862 was mostly twelve-month volunteers with terms about to expire. Enlisted reorganization elections disintegrated the army for two months. Officers pleaded with the ranks to re-enlist, but a majority did not. Those remaining elected majors and colonels whose performance led to officer review boards in October. The boards caused a "rapid and widespread" thinning out of 1,700 incompetent officers. Troops thereafter would elect only second lieutenants.

In early 1862, the popular press suggested the Confederacy required a million men under arms. But veteran soldiers were not re-enlisting, and earlier secessionist volunteers did not reappear to serve in war. One Macon, Georgia, newspaper asked how two million brave fighting men of the South were about to be overcome by four million northerners who were said to be cowards.

Conscription

The Confederacy passed the first American law of national conscription on April 16, 1862. The white males of the Confederate States from 18 to 35 were declared members of the Confederate army for three years, and all men then enlisted were extended to a three-year term. They would serve only in units and under officers of their state. Those under 18 and over 35 could substitute for conscripts, in September those from 35 to 45 became conscripts. The cry of "rich man's war and a poor man's fight" led Congress to abolish the substitute system altogether in December 1863. All principals benefiting earlier were made eligible for service. By February 1864, the age bracket was made 17 to 50, those under eighteen and over forty-five to be limited to in-state duty.

Confederate conscription was not universal; it was a selective service. The First Conscription Act of April 1862 exempted occupations related to transportation, communication, industry, ministers, teaching and physical fitness. The Second Conscription Act of October 1862 expanded exemptions in industry, agriculture and conscientious objection. Exemption fraud proliferated in medical examinations, army furloughs, churches, schools, apothecaries and newspapers.

Rich men's sons were appointed to the socially outcast "overseer" occupation, but the measure was received in the country with "universal odium". The legislative vehicle was the controversial Twenty Negro Law that specifically exempted one white overseer or owner for every plantation with at least 20 slaves. Backpedaling six months later, Congress provided overseers under 45 could be exempted only if they held the occupation before the first Conscription Act. The number of officials under state exemptions appointed by state Governor patronage expanded significantly. By law, substitutes could not be subject to conscription, but instead of adding to Confederate manpower, unit officers in the field reported that over-50 and under-17-year-old substitutes made up to 90% of the desertions.

The Conscription Act of February 1864 "radically changed the whole system" of selection. It abolished industrial exemptions, placing detail authority in President Davis. As the shame of conscription was greater than a felony conviction, the system brought in "about as many volunteers as it did conscripts." Many men in otherwise "bombproof" positions were enlisted in one way or another, nearly 160,000 additional volunteers and conscripts in uniform. Still there was shirking. To administer the draft, a Bureau of Conscription was set up to use state officers, as state Governors would allow. It had a checkered career of "contention, opposition and futility". Armies appointed alternative military "recruiters" to bring in the out-of-uniform 17–50-year-old conscripts and deserters. Nearly 3,000 officers were tasked with the job. By late 1864, Lee was calling for more troops. "Our ranks are constantly diminishing by battle and disease, and few recruits are received; the consequences are inevitable." By March 1865 conscription was to be administered by generals of the state reserves calling out men over 45 and under 18 years old. All exemptions were abolished. These regiments were assigned to recruit conscripts ages 17–50, recover deserters, and repel enemy cavalry raids. The service retained men who had lost but one arm or a leg in home guards. Ultimately, conscription was a failure, and its main value was in goading men to volunteer.

The survival of the Confederacy depended on a strong base of civilians and soldiers devoted to victory. The soldiers performed well, though increasing numbers deserted in the last year of fighting, and the Confederacy never succeeded in replacing casualties as the Union could. The civilians, although enthusiastic in 1861–62, seem to have lost faith in the future of the Confederacy by 1864, and instead looked to protect their homes and communities. As Rable explains, "This contraction of civic vision was more than a crabbed libertarianism; it represented an increasingly widespread disillusionment with the Confederate experiment."

Victories: 1861
The American Civil War broke out in April 1861 with a Confederate victory at the Battle of Fort Sumter in Charleston.

In January, President James Buchanan had attempted to resupply the garrison with the steamship, Star of the West, but Confederate artillery drove it away. In March, President Lincoln notified South Carolina Governor Pickens that without Confederate resistance to the resupply there would be no military reinforcement without further notice, but Lincoln prepared to force resupply if it were not allowed. Confederate President Davis, in cabinet, decided to seize Fort Sumter before the relief fleet arrived, and on April 12, 1861, General Beauregard forced its surrender.

Following Sumter, Lincoln directed states to provide 75,000 troops for three months to recapture the Charleston Harbor forts and all other federal property. This emboldened secessionists in Virginia, Arkansas, Tennessee and North Carolina to secede rather than provide troops to march into neighboring Southern states. In May, Federal troops crossed into Confederate territory along the entire border from the Chesapeake Bay to New Mexico. The first battles were Confederate victories at Big Bethel (Bethel Church, Virginia), First Bull Run (First Manassas) in Virginia July and in August, Wilson's Creek (Oak Hills) in Missouri. At all three, Confederate forces could not follow up their victory due to inadequate supply and shortages of fresh troops to exploit their successes. Following each battle, Federals maintained a military presence and occupied Washington, DC; Fort Monroe, Virginia; and Springfield, Missouri. Both North and South began training up armies for major fighting the next year. Union General George B. McClellan's forces gained possession of much of northwestern Virginia in mid-1861, concentrating on towns and roads; the interior was too large to control and became the center of guerrilla activity. General Robert E. Lee was defeated at Cheat Mountain in September and no serious Confederate advance in western Virginia occurred until the next year.

Meanwhile, the Union Navy seized control of much of the Confederate coastline from Virginia to South Carolina. It took over plantations and the abandoned slaves. Federals there began a war-long policy of burning grain supplies up rivers into the interior wherever they could not occupy. The Union Navy began a blockade of the major southern ports and prepared an invasion of Louisiana to capture New Orleans in early 1862.

Incursions: 1862
The victories of 1861 were followed by a series of defeats east and west in early 1862. To restore the Union by military force, the Federal strategy was to (1) secure the Mississippi River, (2) seize or close Confederate ports, and (3) march on Richmond. To secure independence, the Confederate intent was to (1) repel the invader on all fronts, costing him blood and treasure, and (2) carry the war into the North by two offensives in time to affect the mid-term elections.

Much of northwestern Virginia was under Federal control.
In February and March, most of Missouri and Kentucky were Union "occupied, consolidated, and used as staging areas for advances further South". Following the repulse of Confederate counter-attack at the Battle of Shiloh, Tennessee, permanent Federal occupation expanded west, south and east. Confederate forces repositioned south along the Mississippi River to Memphis, Tennessee, where at the naval Battle of Memphis, its River Defense Fleet was sunk. Confederates withdrew from northern Mississippi and northern Alabama. New Orleans was captured April 29 by a combined Army-Navy force under U.S. Admiral David Farragut, and the Confederacy lost control of the mouth of the Mississippi River. It had to concede extensive agricultural resources that had supported the Union's sea-supplied logistics base.

Although Confederates had suffered major reverses everywhere, as of the end of April the Confederacy still controlled territory holding 72% of its population. Federal forces disrupted Missouri and Arkansas; they had broken through in western Virginia, Kentucky, Tennessee and Louisiana. Along the Confederacy's shores, Union forces had closed ports and made garrisoned lodgments on every coastal Confederate state except Alabama and Texas. Although scholars sometimes assess the Union blockade as ineffectual under international law until the last few months of the war, from the first months it disrupted Confederate privateers, making it "almost impossible to bring their prizes into Confederate ports". British firms developed small fleets of blockade running companies, such as John Fraser and Company and S. Isaac, Campbell & Company while the Ordnance Department secured its own blockade runners for dedicated munitions cargoes.

During the Civil War fleets of armored warships were deployed for the first time in sustained blockades at sea. After some success against the Union blockade, in March the ironclad CSS Virginia was forced into port and burned by Confederates at their retreat. Despite several attempts mounted from their port cities, CSA naval forces were unable to break the Union blockade. Attempts were made by Commodore Josiah Tattnall III's ironclads from Savannah in 1862 with the CSS Atlanta. Secretary of the Navy Stephen Mallory placed his hopes in a European-built ironclad fleet, but they were never realized. On the other hand, four new English-built commerce raiders served the Confederacy, and several fast blockade runners were sold in Confederate ports. They were converted into commerce-raiding cruisers, and manned by their British crews.

In the east, Union forces could not close on Richmond. General McClellan landed his army on the Lower Peninsula of Virginia. Lee subsequently ended that threat from the east, then Union General John Pope attacked overland from the north only to be repulsed at Second Bull Run (Second Manassas). Lee's strike north was turned back at Antietam MD, then Union Major General Ambrose Burnside's offensive was disastrously ended at Fredericksburg VA in December. Both armies then turned to winter quarters to recruit and train for the coming spring.

In an attempt to seize the initiative, reprove, protect farms in mid-growing season and influence U.S. Congressional elections, two major Confederate incursions into Union territory had been launched in August and September 1862. Both Braxton Bragg's invasion of Kentucky and Lee's invasion of Maryland were decisively repulsed, leaving Confederates in control of but 63% of its population. Civil War scholar Allan Nevins argues that 1862 was the strategic high-water mark of the Confederacy. The failures of the two invasions were attributed to the same irrecoverable shortcomings: lack of manpower at the front, lack of supplies including serviceable shoes, and exhaustion after long marches without adequate food. Also in September Confederate General William W. Loring pushed Federal forces from Charleston, Virginia, and the Kanawha Valley in western Virginia, but lacking reinforcements Loring abandoned his position and by November the region was back in Federal control.

Anaconda: 1863–1864
The failed Middle Tennessee campaign was ended January 2, 1863, at the inconclusive Battle of Stones River (Murfreesboro), both sides losing the largest percentage of casualties suffered during the war. It was followed by another strategic withdrawal by Confederate forces. The Confederacy won a significant victory April 1863, repulsing the Federal advance on Richmond at Chancellorsville, but the Union consolidated positions along the Virginia coast and the Chesapeake Bay.

Without an effective answer to Federal gunboats, river transport and supply, the Confederacy lost the Mississippi River following the capture of Vicksburg, Mississippi, and Port Hudson in July, ending Southern access to the trans-Mississippi West. July brought short-lived counters, Morgan's Raid into Ohio and the New York City draft riots. Robert E. Lee's strike into Pennsylvania was repulsed at Gettysburg, Pennsylvania despite Pickett's famous charge and other acts of valor. Southern newspapers assessed the campaign as "The Confederates did not gain a victory, neither did the enemy."

September and November left Confederates yielding Chattanooga, Tennessee, the gateway to the lower south. For the remainder of the war fighting was restricted inside the South, resulting in a slow but continuous loss of territory. In early 1864, the Confederacy still controlled 53% of its population, but it withdrew further to reestablish defensive positions. Union offensives continued with Sherman's March to the Sea to take Savannah and Grant's Wilderness Campaign to encircle Richmond and besiege Lee's army at Petersburg.

In April 1863, the C.S. Congress authorized a uniformed Volunteer Navy, many of whom were British. The Confederacy had altogether eighteen commerce-destroying cruisers, which seriously disrupted Federal commerce at sea and increased shipping insurance rates 900%. Commodore Tattnall again unsuccessfully attempted to break the Union blockade on the Savannah River in Georgia with an ironclad in 1863. Beginning in April 1864 the ironclad CSS Albemarle engaged Union gunboats for six months on the Roanoke River in North Carolina. The Federals closed Mobile Bay by sea-based amphibious assault in August, ending Gulf coast trade east of the Mississippi River. In December, the Battle of Nashville ended Confederate operations in the western theater.

Large numbers of families relocated to safer places, usually remote rural areas, bringing along household slaves if they had any. Mary Massey argues these elite exiles introduced an element of defeatism into the southern outlook.

Collapse: 1865
The first three months of 1865 saw the Federal Carolinas Campaign, devastating a wide swath of the remaining Confederate heartland. The "breadbasket of the Confederacy" in the Great Valley of Virginia was occupied by Philip Sheridan. The Union Blockade captured Fort Fisher in North Carolina, and Sherman finally took Charleston, South Carolina, by land attack.

The Confederacy controlled no ports, harbors or navigable rivers. Railroads were captured or had ceased operating. Its major food-producing regions had been war-ravaged or occupied. Its administration survived in only three pockets of territory holding only one-third of its population. Its armies were defeated or disbanding. At the February 1865 Hampton Roads Conference with Lincoln, senior Confederate officials rejected his invitation to restore the Union with compensation for emancipated slaves. The three pockets of unoccupied Confederacy were southern Virginia – North Carolina, central Alabama – Florida, and Texas, the latter two areas less from any notion of resistance than from the disinterest of Federal forces to occupy them. The Davis policy was independence or nothing, while Lee's army was wracked by disease and desertion, barely holding the trenches defending Jefferson Davis' capital.

The Confederacy's last remaining blockade-running port, Wilmington, North Carolina, was lost. When the Union broke through Lee's lines at Petersburg, Richmond fell immediately. Lee surrendered a remnant of 50,000 from the Army of Northern Virginia at Appomattox Court House, Virginia, on April 9, 1865. "The Surrender" marked the end of the Confederacy.
The CSS Stonewall sailed from Europe to break the Union blockade in March; on making Havana, Cuba, it surrendered. Some high officials escaped to Europe, but President Davis was captured May 10; all remaining Confederate land forces surrendered by June 1865. The U.S. Army took control of the Confederate areas without post-surrender insurgency or guerrilla warfare against them, but peace was subsequently marred by a great deal of local violence, feuding and revenge killings. The last confederate military unit, the commerce raider CSS Shenandoah, surrendered on November 6, 1865, in Liverpool.

Historian Gary Gallagher concluded that the Confederacy capitulated in early 1865 because northern armies crushed "organized southern military resistance". The Confederacy's population, soldier and civilian, had suffered material hardship and social disruption. They had expended and extracted a profusion of blood and treasure until collapse; "the end had come". Jefferson Davis' assessment in 1890 determined, "With the capture of the capital, the dispersion of the civil authorities, the surrender of the armies in the field, and the arrest of the President, the Confederate States of America disappeared ... their history henceforth became a part of the history of the United States."

Postwar history

Amnesty and treason issue

When the war ended over 14,000 Confederates petitioned President Johnson for a pardon; he was generous in giving them out. He issued a general amnesty to all Confederate participants in the "late Civil War" in 1868. Congress passed additional Amnesty Acts in May 1866 with restrictions on office holding, and the Amnesty Act in May 1872 lifting those restrictions. There was a great deal of discussion in 1865 about bringing treason trials, especially against Jefferson Davis. There was no consensus in President Johnson's cabinet, and no one was charged with treason. An acquittal of Davis would have been humiliating for the government.

Davis was indicted for treason but never tried; he was released from prison on bail in May 1867. The amnesty of December 25, 1868, by President Johnson eliminated any possibility of Jefferson Davis (or anyone else associated with the Confederacy) standing trial for treason.

Henry Wirz, the commandant of a notorious prisoner-of-war camp near Andersonville, Georgia, was tried and convicted by a military court, and executed on November 10, 1865. The charges against him involved conspiracy and cruelty, not treason.

The U.S. government began a decade-long process known as Reconstruction which attempted to resolve the political and constitutional issues of the Civil War. The priorities were: to guarantee that Confederate nationalism and slavery were ended, to ratify and enforce the Thirteenth Amendment which outlawed slavery; the Fourteenth which guaranteed dual U.S. and state citizenship to all native-born residents, regardless of race; and the Fifteenth, which made it illegal to deny the right to vote because of race.

By 1877, the Compromise of 1877 ended Reconstruction in the former Confederate states. Federal troops were withdrawn from the South, where conservative white Democrats had already regained political control of state governments, often through extreme violence and fraud to suppress black voting. The prewar South had many rich areas; the war left the entire region economically devastated by military action, ruined infrastructure, and exhausted resources. Still dependent on an agricultural economy and resisting investment in infrastructure, it remained dominated by the planter elite into the next century. Confederate veterans had been temporarily disenfranchised by Reconstruction policy, and Democrat-dominated legislatures passed new constitutions and amendments to now exclude most blacks and many poor whites. This exclusion and a weakened Republican Party remained the norm until the Voting Rights Act of 1965. The Solid South of the early 20th century did not achieve national levels of prosperity until long after World War II.

Texas v. White
In Texas v. White,  the United States Supreme Court ruled – by a 5–3 majority – that Texas had remained a state ever since it first joined the Union, despite claims that it joined the Confederate States of America. In this case, the court held that the Constitution did not permit a state to unilaterally secede from the United States. Further, that the ordinances of secession, and all the acts of the legislatures within seceding states intended to give effect to such ordinances, were "absolutely null", under the Constitution. This case settled the law that applied to all questions regarding state legislation during the war. Furthermore, it decided one of the "central constitutional questions" of the Civil War: The Union is perpetual and indestructible, as a matter of constitutional law. In declaring that no state could leave the Union, "except through revolution or through consent of the States", it was "explicitly repudiating the position of the Confederate states that the United States was a voluntary compact between sovereign states".

Theories regarding the Confederacy's demise

"Died of states' rights"
Historian Frank Lawrence Owsley argued that the Confederacy "died of states' rights". The central government was denied requisitioned soldiers and money by governors and state legislatures because they feared that Richmond would encroach on the rights of the states. Georgia's governor Joseph Brown warned of a secret conspiracy by Jefferson Davis to destroy states' rights and individual liberty. The first conscription act in North America, authorizing Davis to draft soldiers, was said to be the "essence of military despotism".

Vice President Alexander H. Stephens feared losing the very form of republican government. Allowing President Davis to threaten "arbitrary arrests" to draft hundreds of governor-appointed "bomb-proof" bureaucrats conferred "more power than the English Parliament had ever bestowed on the king. History proved the dangers of such unchecked authority." The abolishment of draft exemptions for newspaper editors was interpreted as an attempt by the Confederate government to muzzle presses, such as the Raleigh NC Standard, to control elections and to suppress the peace meetings there. As Rable concludes, "For Stephens, the essence of patriotism, the heart of the Confederate cause, rested on an unyielding commitment to traditional rights" without considerations of military necessity, pragmatism or compromise.

In 1863, Governor Pendleton Murrah of Texas determined that state troops were required for defense against Plains Indians and Union forces that might attack from Kansas. He refused to send his soldiers to the East. Governor Zebulon Vance of North Carolina showed intense opposition to conscription, limiting recruitment success. Vance's faith in states' rights drove him into repeated, stubborn opposition to the Davis administration.

Despite political differences within the Confederacy, no national political parties were formed because they were seen as illegitimate. "Anti-partyism became an article of political faith." Without a system of political parties building alternate sets of national leaders, electoral protests tended to be narrowly state-based, "negative, carping and petty". The 1863 mid-term elections became mere expressions of futile and frustrated dissatisfaction. According to historian David M. Potter, the lack of a functioning two-party system caused "real and direct damage" to the Confederate war effort since it prevented the formulation of any effective alternatives to the conduct of the war by the Davis administration.

"Died of Davis"
The enemies of President Davis proposed that the Confederacy "died of Davis". He was unfavorably compared to George Washington by critics such as Edward Alfred Pollard, editor of the most influential newspaper in the Confederacy, the Richmond (Virginia) Examiner. E. Merton Coulter summarizes, "The American Revolution had its Washington; the Southern Revolution had its Davis ... one succeeded and the other failed." Beyond the early honeymoon period, Davis was never popular. He unwittingly caused much internal dissension from early on. His ill health and temporary bouts of blindness disabled him for days at a time.

Coulter, viewed by today's historians as a Confederate apologist, says Davis was heroic and his will was indomitable. But his "tenacity, determination, and will power" stirred up lasting opposition from enemies that Davis could not shake. He failed to overcome "petty leaders of the states" who made the term "Confederacy" into a label for tyranny and oppression, preventing the "Stars and Bars" from becoming a symbol of larger patriotic service and sacrifice. Instead of campaigning to develop nationalism and gain support for his administration, he rarely courted public opinion, assuming an aloofness, "almost like an Adams". 

Escott argues that Davis was unable to mobilize Confederate nationalism in support of his government effectively, and especially failed to appeal to the small farmers who comprised the bulk of the population. In addition to the problems caused by states rights, Escott also emphasizes that the widespread opposition to any strong central government combined with the vast difference in wealth between the slave-owning class and the small farmers created insolvable dilemmas when the Confederate survival presupposed a strong central government backed by a united populace. The prewar claim that white solidarity was necessary to provide a unified Southern voice in Washington no longer held. Davis failed to build a network of supporters who would speak up when he came under criticism, and he repeatedly alienated governors and other state-based leaders by demanding centralized control of the war effort.

According to Coulter, Davis was not an efficient administrator as he attended to too many details, protected his friends after their failures were obvious, and spent too much time on military affairs versus his civic responsibilities. Coulter concludes he was not the ideal leader for the Southern Revolution, but he showed "fewer weaknesses than any other" contemporary character available for the role.

Robert E. Lee's assessment of Davis as president was, "I knew of none that could have done as well."

Government and politics

Political divisions

Constitution 

The Southern leaders met in Montgomery, Alabama, to write their constitution. Much of the Confederate States Constitution replicated the United States Constitution verbatim, but it contained several explicit protections of the institution of slavery including provisions for the recognition and protection of slavery in any territory of the Confederacy. It maintained the ban on international slave-trading, though it made the ban's application explicit to "Negroes of the African race" in contrast to the U.S. Constitution's reference to "such Persons as any of the States now existing shall think proper to admit". It protected the existing internal trade of slaves among slaveholding states.

In certain areas, the Confederate Constitution gave greater powers to the states (or curtailed the powers of the central government more) than the U.S. Constitution of the time did, but in other areas, the states lost rights they had under the U.S. Constitution. Although the Confederate Constitution, like the U.S. Constitution, contained a commerce clause, the Confederate version prohibited the central government from using revenues collected in one state for funding internal improvements in another state. The Confederate Constitution's equivalent to the U.S. Constitution's general welfare clause prohibited protective tariffs (but allowed tariffs for providing domestic revenue), and spoke of "carry[ing] on the Government of the Confederate States" rather than providing for the "general welfare". State legislatures had the power to impeach officials of the Confederate government in some cases. On the other hand, the Confederate Constitution contained a Necessary and Proper Clause and a Supremacy Clause that essentially duplicated the respective clauses of the U.S. Constitution. The Confederate Constitution also incorporated each of the 12 amendments to the U.S. Constitution that had been ratified up to that point.

The Confederate Constitution did not specifically include a provision allowing states to secede; the Preamble spoke of each state "acting in its sovereign and independent character" but also of the formation of a "permanent federal government". During the debates on drafting the Confederate Constitution, one proposal would have allowed states to secede from the Confederacy. The proposal was tabled with only the South Carolina delegates voting in favor of considering the motion. The Confederate Constitution also explicitly denied States the power to bar slaveholders from other parts of the Confederacy from bringing their slaves into any state of the Confederacy or to interfere with the property rights of slave owners traveling between different parts of the Confederacy. In contrast with the secular language of the United States Constitution, the Confederate Constitution overtly asked God's blessing ("... invoking the favor and guidance of Almighty God ...").

Some historians have referred to the Confederacy as a form of Herrenvolk democracy.

Executive

The Montgomery Convention to establish the Confederacy and its executive met on February 4, 1861. Each state as a sovereignty had one vote, with the same delegation size as it held in the U.S. Congress, and generally 41 to 50 members attended. Offices were "provisional", limited to a term not to exceed one year. One name was placed in nomination for president, one for vice president. Both were elected unanimously, 6–0.

Jefferson Davis was elected provisional president. His U.S. Senate resignation speech greatly impressed with its clear rationale for secession and his pleading for a peaceful departure from the Union to independence. Although he had made it known that he wanted to be commander-in-chief of the Confederate armies, when elected, he assumed the office of Provisional President. Three candidates for provisional Vice President were under consideration the night before the February 9 election. All were from Georgia, and the various delegations meeting in different places determined two would not do, so Alexander H. Stephens was elected unanimously provisional Vice President, though with some privately held reservations. Stephens was inaugurated February 11, Davis February 18.

Davis and Stephens were elected president and vice president, unopposed on November 6, 1861. They were inaugurated on February 22, 1862.

Coulter stated, "No president of the U.S. ever had a more difficult task." Washington was inaugurated in peacetime. Lincoln inherited an established government of long standing. The creation of the Confederacy was accomplished by men who saw themselves as fundamentally conservative. Although they referred to their "Revolution", it was in their eyes more a counter-revolution against changes away from their understanding of U.S. founding documents. In Davis' inauguration speech, he explained the Confederacy was not a French-like revolution, but a transfer of rule. The Montgomery Convention had assumed all the laws of the United States until superseded by the Confederate Congress.

The Permanent Constitution provided for a President of the Confederate States of America, elected to serve a six-year term but without the possibility of re-election. Unlike the United States Constitution, the Confederate Constitution gave the president the ability to subject a bill to a line item veto, a power also held by some state governors.

The Confederate Congress could overturn either the general or the line item vetoes with the same two-thirds votes required in the U.S. Congress. In addition, appropriations not specifically requested by the executive branch required passage by a two-thirds vote in both houses of Congress. The only person to serve as president was Jefferson Davis, as the Confederacy was defeated before the completion of his term.

Administration and cabinet

Legislative

The only two "formal, national, functioning, civilian administrative bodies" in the Civil War South were the Jefferson Davis administration and the Confederate Congresses. The Confederacy was begun by the Provisional Congress in Convention at Montgomery, Alabama on February 28, 1861. The Provisional Confederate Congress was a unicameral assembly; each state received one vote.

The Permanent Confederate Congress was elected and began its first session February 18, 1862. The Permanent Congress for the Confederacy followed the United States forms with a bicameral legislature. The Senate had two per state, twenty-six Senators. The House numbered 106 representatives apportioned by free and slave populations within each state. Two Congresses sat in six sessions until March 18, 1865.

The political influences of the civilian, soldier vote and appointed representatives reflected divisions of political geography of a diverse South. These in turn changed over time relative to Union occupation and disruption, the war impact on the local economy, and the course of the war. Without political parties, key candidate identification related to adopting secession before or after Lincoln's call for volunteers to retake Federal property. Previous party affiliation played a part in voter selection, predominantly secessionist Democrat or unionist Whig.

The absence of political parties made individual roll call voting all the more important, as the Confederate "freedom of roll-call voting [was] unprecedented in American legislative history." Key issues throughout the life of the Confederacy related to (1) suspension of habeas corpus, (2) military concerns such as control of state militia, conscription and exemption, (3) economic and fiscal policy including impressment of slaves, goods and scorched earth, and (4) support of the Jefferson Davis administration in its foreign affairs and negotiating peace.

Provisional Congress
For the first year, the unicameral Provisional Confederate Congress functioned as the Confederacy's legislative branch.

President of the Provisional Congress
 Howell Cobb, Sr. of Georgia, February 4, 1861 – February 17, 1862

Presidents pro tempore of the Provisional Congress
 Robert Woodward Barnwell of South Carolina, February 4, 1861
 Thomas Stanhope Bocock of Virginia, December 10–21, 1861 and January 7–8, 1862
 Josiah Abigail Patterson Campbell of Mississippi, December 23–24, 1861 and January 6, 1862

Sessions of the Confederate Congress
 Provisional Congress
 1st Congress
 2nd Congress

Tribal Representatives to Confederate Congress
 Elias Cornelius Boudinot 1862–65, Cherokee
 Samuel Benton Callahan Unknown years, Creek, Seminole
 Burton Allen Holder 1864–65, Chickasaw
 Robert McDonald Jones 1863–65, Choctaw

Judicial

The Confederate Constitution outlined a judicial branch of the government, but the ongoing war and resistance from states-rights advocates, particularly on the question of whether it would have appellate jurisdiction over the state courts, prevented the creation or seating of the "Supreme Court of the Confederate States;" the state courts generally continued to operate as they had done, simply recognizing the Confederate States as the national government.

Confederate district courts were authorized by Article III, Section 1, of the Confederate Constitution, and President Davis appointed judges within the individual states of the Confederate States of America. In many cases, the same US Federal District Judges were appointed as Confederate States District Judges. Confederate district courts began reopening in early 1861, handling many of the same type cases as had been done before. Prize cases, in which Union ships were captured by the Confederate Navy or raiders and sold through court proceedings, were heard until the blockade of southern ports made this impossible. After a Sequestration Act was passed by the Confederate Congress, the Confederate district courts heard many cases in which enemy aliens (typically Northern absentee landlords owning property in the South) had their property sequestered (seized) by Confederate Receivers.

When the matter came before the Confederate court, the property owner could not appear because he was unable to travel across the front lines between Union and Confederate forces. Thus, the District Attorney won the case by default, the property was typically sold, and the money used to further the Southern war effort. Eventually, because there was no Confederate Supreme Court, sharp attorneys like South Carolina's Edward McCrady began filing appeals. This prevented their clients' property from being sold until a supreme court could be constituted to hear the appeal, which never occurred. Where Federal troops gained control over parts of the Confederacy and re-established civilian government, US district courts sometimes resumed jurisdiction.

Supreme Court – not established.

District Courts – judges

 Alabama William Giles Jones 1861–1865
 Arkansas Daniel Ringo 1861–1865
 Florida Jesse J. Finley 1861–1862
 Georgia Henry R. Jackson 1861, Edward J. Harden 1861–1865
 Louisiana Edwin Warren Moise 1861–1865
 Mississippi Alexander Mosby Clayton 1861–1865
 North Carolina Asa Biggs 1861–1865

 South Carolina Andrew G. Magrath 1861–1864, Benjamin F. Perry 1865
 Tennessee West H. Humphreys 1861–1865
 Texas-East William Pinckney Hill 1861–1865
 Texas-West Thomas J. Devine 1861–1865
 Virginia-East James D. Halyburton 1861–1865
 Virginia-West John W. Brockenbrough 1861–1865

Post Office

When the Confederacy was formed and its seceding states broke from the Union, it was at once confronted with the arduous task of providing its citizens with a mail delivery system, and, in the midst of the American Civil War, the newly formed Confederacy created and established the Confederate Post Office. One of the first undertakings in establishing the Post Office was the appointment of John H. Reagan to the position of Postmaster General, by Jefferson Davis in 1861, making him the first Postmaster General of the Confederate Post Office as well as a member of Davis' presidential cabinet. Writing in 1906, historian Walter Flavius McCaleb praised Reagan's "energy and intelligence... in a degree scarcely matched by any of his associates."

When the war began, the US Post Office still delivered mail from the secessionist states for a brief period of time. Mail that was postmarked after the date of a state's admission into the Confederacy through May 31, 1861, and bearing US postage was still delivered. After this time, private express companies still managed to carry some of the mail across enemy lines. Later, mail that crossed lines had to be sent by 'Flag of Truce' and was allowed to pass at only two specific points. Mail sent from the Confederacy to the U.S. was received, opened and inspected at Fortress Monroe on the Virginia coast before being passed on into the U.S. mail stream. Mail sent from the North to the South passed at City Point, also in Virginia, where it was also inspected before being sent on.

With the chaos of the war, a working postal system was more important than ever for the Confederacy. The Civil War had divided family members and friends and consequently letter writing increased dramatically across the entire divided nation, especially to and from the men who were away serving in an army. Mail delivery was also important for the Confederacy for a myriad of business and military reasons. Because of the Union blockade, basic supplies were always in demand and so getting mailed correspondence out of the country to suppliers was imperative to the successful operation of the Confederacy. Volumes of material have been written about the Blockade runners who evaded Union ships on blockade patrol, usually at night, and who moved cargo and mail in and out of the Confederate States throughout the course of the war. Of particular interest to students and historians of the American Civil War is Prisoner of War mail and Blockade mail as these items were often involved with a variety of military and other war time activities. The postal history of the Confederacy along with surviving Confederate mail has helped historians document the various people, places and events that were involved in the American Civil War as it unfolded.

Civil liberties
The Confederacy actively used the army to arrest people suspected of loyalty to the United States. Historian Mark Neely found 4,108 names of men arrested and estimated a much larger total. The Confederacy arrested pro-Union civilians in the South at about the same rate as the Union arrested pro-Confederate civilians in the North. Neely argues:

Economy

Slaves
Across the South, widespread rumors alarmed the whites by predicting the slaves were planning some sort of insurrection. Patrols were stepped up. The slaves did become increasingly independent, and resistant to punishment, but historians agree there were no insurrections. In the invaded areas, insubordination was more the norm than was loyalty to the old master; Bell Wiley says, "It was not disloyalty, but the lure of freedom." Many slaves became spies for the North, and large numbers ran away to federal lines.

Lincoln's Emancipation Proclamation, an executive order of the U.S. government on January 1, 1863, changed the legal status of three million slaves in designated areas of the Confederacy from "slave" to "free". The long-term effect was that the Confederacy could not preserve the institution of slavery, and lost the use of the core element of its plantation labor force. Slaves were legally freed by the Proclamation, and became free by escaping to federal lines, or by advances of federal troops. Over 200,000 freed slaves were hired by the federal army as teamsters, cooks, launderers and laborers, and eventually as soldiers. Plantation owners, realizing that emancipation would destroy their economic system, sometimes moved their slaves as far as possible out of reach of the Union army. Though the concept was promoted within certain circles of the Union hierarchy during and immediately following the war, no program of reparations for freed slaves was ever attempted. Unlike other Western countries, such as Britain and France, the U.S. government never paid compensation to Southern slave owners for their "lost property".

Political economy
Most whites were subsistence farmers who traded their surpluses locally. The plantations of the South, with white ownership and an enslaved labor force, produced substantial wealth from cash crops. It supplied two-thirds of the world's cotton, which was in high demand for textiles, along with tobacco, sugar, and naval stores (such as turpentine). These raw materials were exported to factories in Europe and the Northeast. Planters reinvested their profits in more slaves and fresh land, as cotton and tobacco depleted the soil. There was little manufacturing or mining; shipping was controlled by non-southerners.

The plantations that enslaved over three million black people were the principal source of wealth. Most were concentrated in "black belt" plantation areas (because few white families in the poor regions owned slaves). For decades, there had been widespread fear of slave revolts. During the war, extra men were assigned to "home guard" patrol duty and governors sought to keep militia units at home for protection. Historian William Barney reports, "no major slave revolts erupted during the Civil War." Nevertheless, slaves took the opportunity to enlarge their sphere of independence, and when union forces were nearby, many ran off to join them.

Slave labor was applied in industry in a limited way in the Upper South and in a few port cities. One reason for the regional lag in industrial development was top-heavy income distribution. Mass production requires mass markets, and slaves living in small cabins, using self-made tools and outfitted with one suit of work clothes each year of inferior fabric, did not generate consumer demand to sustain local manufactures of any description in the same way as did a mechanized family farm of free labor in the North. The Southern economy was "pre-capitalist" in that slaves were put to work in the largest revenue-producing enterprises, not free labor markets. That labor system as practiced in the American South encompassed paternalism, whether abusive or indulgent, and that meant labor management considerations apart from productivity.

Approximately 85% of both the North and South white populations lived on family farms, both regions were predominantly agricultural, and mid-century industry in both was mostly domestic. But the Southern economy was pre-capitalist in its overwhelming reliance on the agriculture of cash crops to produce wealth, while the great majority of farmers fed themselves and supplied a small local market. Southern cities and industries grew faster than ever before, but the thrust of the rest of the country's exponential growth elsewhere was toward urban industrial development along transportation systems of canals and railroads. The South was following the dominant currents of the American economic mainstream, but at a "great distance" as it lagged in the all-weather modes of transportation that brought cheaper, speedier freight shipment and forged new, expanding inter-regional markets.

A third count of the pre-capitalist Southern economy relates to the cultural setting. The South and southerners did not adopt a work ethic, nor the habits of thrift that marked the rest of the country. It had access to the tools of capitalism, but it did not adopt its culture. The Southern Cause as a national economy in the Confederacy was grounded in "slavery and race, planters and patricians, plain folk and folk culture, cotton and plantations".

National production

The Confederacy started its existence as an agrarian economy with exports, to a world market, of cotton, and, to a lesser extent, tobacco and sugarcane. Local food production included grains, hogs, cattle, and gardens. The cash came from exports but the Southern people spontaneously stopped exports in early 1861 to hasten the impact of "King Cotton", a failed strategy to coerce international support for the Confederacy through its cotton exports. When the blockade was announced, commercial shipping practically ended (the ships could not get insurance), and only a trickle of supplies came via blockade runners. The cutoff of exports was an economic disaster for the South, rendering useless its most valuable properties, its plantations and their enslaved workers. Many planters kept growing cotton, which piled up everywhere, but most turned to food production. All across the region, the lack of repair and maintenance wasted away the physical assets.

The eleven states had produced $155 million in manufactured goods in 1860, chiefly from local grist-mills, and lumber, processed tobacco, cotton goods and naval stores such as turpentine. The main industrial areas were border cities such as Baltimore, Wheeling, Louisville and St. Louis, that were never under Confederate control. The government did set up munitions factories in the Deep South. Combined with captured munitions and those coming via blockade runners, the armies were kept minimally supplied with weapons. The soldiers suffered from reduced rations, lack of medicines, and the growing shortages of uniforms, shoes and boots. Shortages were much worse for civilians, and the prices of necessities steadily rose.

The Confederacy adopted a tariff or tax on imports of 15%, and imposed it on all imports from other countries, including the United States. The tariff mattered little; the Union blockade minimized commercial traffic through the Confederacy's ports, and very few people paid taxes on goods smuggled from the North. The Confederate government in its entire history collected only $3.5 million in tariff revenue. The lack of adequate financial resources led the Confederacy to finance the war through printing money, which led to high inflation. The Confederacy underwent an economic revolution by centralization and standardization, but it was too little too late as its economy was systematically strangled by blockade and raids.

Transportation systems

In peacetime, the South's extensive and connected systems of navigable rivers and coastal access allowed for cheap and easy transportation of agricultural products. The railroad system in the South had developed as a supplement to the navigable rivers to enhance the all-weather shipment of cash crops to market. Railroads tied plantation areas to the nearest river or seaport and so made supply more dependable, lowered costs and increased profits. In the event of invasion, the vast geography of the Confederacy made logistics difficult for the Union. Wherever Union armies invaded, they assigned many of their soldiers to garrison captured areas and to protect rail lines.

At the onset of the Civil War the South had a rail network disjointed and plagued by changes in track gauge as well as lack of interchange. Locomotives and freight cars had fixed axles and could not use tracks of different gauges (widths). Railroads of different gauges leading to the same city required all freight to be off-loaded onto wagons for transport to the connecting railroad station, where it had to await freight cars and a locomotive before proceeding. Centers requiring off-loading included Vicksburg, New Orleans, Montgomery, Wilmington and Richmond. In addition, most rail lines led from coastal or river ports to inland cities, with few lateral railroads. Because of this design limitation, the relatively primitive railroads of the Confederacy were unable to overcome the Union naval blockade of the South's crucial intra-coastal and river routes.

The Confederacy had no plan to expand, protect or encourage its railroads. Southerners' refusal to export the cotton crop in 1861 left railroads bereft of their main source of income. Many lines had to lay off employees; many critical skilled technicians and engineers were permanently lost to military service. In the early years of the war the Confederate government had a hands-off approach to the railroads. Only in mid-1863 did the Confederate government initiate a national policy, and it was confined solely to aiding the war effort. Railroads came under the de facto control of the military. In contrast, the U.S. Congress had authorized military administration of Union-controlled railroad and telegraph systems in January 1862, imposed a standard gauge, and built railroads into the South using that gauge. Confederate armies successfully reoccupying territory could not be resupplied directly by rail as they advanced. The C.S. Congress formally authorized military administration of railroads in February 1865.

In the last year before the end of the war, the Confederate railroad system stood permanently on the verge of collapse. There was no new equipment and raids on both sides systematically destroyed key bridges, as well as locomotives and freight cars. Spare parts were cannibalized; feeder lines were torn up to get replacement rails for trunk lines, and rolling stock wore out through heavy use.

Horses and mules
The Confederate army experienced a persistent shortage of horses and mules, and requisitioned them with dubious promissory notes given to local farmers and breeders. Union forces paid in real money and found ready sellers in the South. Both armies needed horses for cavalry and for artillery. Mules pulled the wagons. The supply was undermined by an unprecedented epidemic of glanders, a fatal disease that baffled veterinarians. After 1863 the invading Union forces had a policy of shooting all the local horses and mules that they did not need, in order to keep them out of Confederate hands. The Confederate armies and farmers experienced a growing shortage of horses and mules, which hurt the Southern economy and the war effort. The South lost half of its 2.5 million horses and mules; many farmers ended the war with none left. Army horses were used up by hard work, malnourishment, disease and battle wounds; they had a life expectancy of about seven months.

Financial instruments
Both the individual Confederate states and later the Confederate government printed Confederate States of America dollars as paper currency in various denominations, with a total face value of $1.5 billion. Much of it was signed by Treasurer Edward C. Elmore. Inflation became rampant as the paper money depreciated and eventually became worthless. The state governments and some localities printed their own paper money, adding to the runaway inflation. Many bills still exist, although in recent years counterfeit copies have proliferated.

The Confederate government initially wanted to finance its war mostly through tariffs on imports, export taxes, and voluntary donations of gold. After the spontaneous imposition of an embargo on cotton sales to Europe in 1861, these sources of revenue dried up and the Confederacy increasingly turned to issuing debt and printing money to pay for war expenses. The Confederate States politicians were worried about angering the general population with hard taxes. A tax increase might disillusion many Southerners, so the Confederacy resorted to printing more money. As a result, inflation increased and remained a problem for the southern states throughout the rest of the war. By April 1863, for example, the cost of flour in Richmond had risen to $100 a barrel and housewives were rioting.

The Confederate government took over the three national mints in its territory: the Charlotte Mint in North Carolina, the Dahlonega Mint in Georgia, and the New Orleans Mint in Louisiana. During 1861 all of these facilities produced small amounts of gold coinage, and the latter half dollars as well. Since the mints used the current dies on hand, all appear to be U.S. issues. However, by comparing slight differences in the dies specialists can distinguish 1861-O half dollars that were minted either under the authority of the U.S. government, the State of Louisiana, or finally the Confederate States. Unlike the gold coins, this issue was produced in significant numbers (over 2.5 million) and is inexpensive in lower grades, although fakes have been made for sale to the public. However, before the New Orleans Mint ceased operation in May, 1861, the Confederate government used its own reverse design to strike four half dollars. This made one of the great rarities of American numismatics. A lack of silver and gold precluded further coinage. The Confederacy apparently also experimented with issuing one cent coins, although only 12 were produced by a jeweler in Philadelphia, who was afraid to send them to the South. Like the half dollars, copies were later made as souvenirs.

US coinage was hoarded and did not have any general circulation. U.S. coinage was admitted as legal tender up to $10, as were British sovereigns, French Napoleons and Spanish and Mexican doubloons at a fixed rate of exchange. Confederate money was paper and postage stamps.

Food shortages and riots

By mid-1861, the Union naval blockade virtually shut down the export of cotton and the import of manufactured goods. Food that formerly came overland was cut off.

As women were the ones who remained at home, they had to make do with the lack of food and supplies. They cut back on purchases, used old materials, and planted more flax and peas to provide clothing and food. They used ersatz substitutes when possible, but there was no real coffee, only okra and chicory substitutes. The households were severely hurt by inflation in the cost of everyday items like flour, and the shortages of food, fodder for the animals, and medical supplies for the wounded.

State governments requested that planters grow less cotton and more food, but most refused. When cotton prices soared in Europe, expectations were that Europe would soon intervene to break the blockade and make them rich, but Europe remained neutral. The Georgia legislature imposed cotton quotas, making it a crime to grow an excess. But food shortages only worsened, especially in the towns.

The overall decline in food supplies, made worse by the inadequate transportation system, led to serious shortages and high prices in urban areas. When bacon reached a dollar a pound in 1863, the poor women of Richmond, Atlanta and many other cities began to riot; they broke into shops and warehouses to seize food, as they were angry at ineffective state relief efforts, speculators, and merchants. As wives and widows of soldiers, they were hurt by the inadequate welfare system.

Devastation by 1865
By the end of the war deterioration of the Southern infrastructure was widespread. The number of civilian deaths is unknown. Every Confederate state was affected, but most of the war was fought in Virginia and Tennessee, while Texas and Florida saw the least military action. Much of the damage was caused by direct military action, but most was caused by lack of repairs and upkeep, and by deliberately using up resources. Historians have recently estimated how much of the devastation was caused by military action. Paul Paskoff calculates that Union military operations were conducted in 56% of 645 counties in nine Confederate states (excluding Texas and Florida). These counties contained 63% of the 1860 white population and 64% of the slaves. By the time the fighting took place, undoubtedly some people had fled to safer areas, so the exact population exposed to war is unknown.

The eleven Confederate States in the 1860 United States Census had 297 towns and cities with 835,000 people; of these 162 with 681,000 people were at one point occupied by Union forces. Eleven were destroyed or severely damaged by war action, including Atlanta (with an 1860 population of 9,600), Charleston, Columbia, and Richmond (with prewar populations of 40,500, 8,100, and 37,900, respectively); the eleven contained 115,900 people in the 1860 census, or 14% of the urban South. Historians have not estimated what their actual population was when Union forces arrived. The number of people (as of 1860) who lived in the destroyed towns represented just over 1% of the Confederacy's 1860 population. In addition, 45 court houses were burned (out of 830). The South's agriculture was not highly mechanized. The value of farm implements and machinery in the 1860 Census was $81 million; by 1870, there was 40% less, worth just $48 million. Many old tools had broken through heavy use; new tools were rarely available; even repairs were difficult.

The economic losses affected everyone. Banks and insurance companies were mostly bankrupt. Confederate currency and bonds were worthless. The billions of dollars invested in slaves vanished. Most debts were also left behind. Most farms were intact but most had lost their horses, mules and cattle; fences and barns were in disrepair. Paskoff shows the loss of farm infrastructure was about the same whether or not fighting took place nearby. The loss of infrastructure and productive capacity meant that rural widows throughout the region faced not only the absence of able-bodied men, but a depleted stock of material resources that they could manage and operate themselves. During four years of warfare, disruption, and blockades, the South used up about half its capital stock. The North, by contrast, absorbed its material losses so effortlessly that it appeared richer at the end of the war than at the beginning.

The rebuilding took years and was hindered by the low price of cotton after the war. Outside investment was essential, especially in railroads. One historian has summarized the collapse of the transportation infrastructure needed for economic recovery:

Effect on women and families

More than 250,000 Confederate soldiers died during the war. Some widows abandoned their family farms and merged into the households of relatives, or even became refugees living in camps with high rates of disease and death. In the Old South, being an "old maid" was something of an embarrassment to the woman and her family, but after the war, it became almost a norm. Some women welcomed the freedom of not having to marry. Divorce, while never fully accepted, became more common. The concept of the "New Woman" emerged – she was self-sufficient and independent, and stood in sharp contrast to the "Southern Belle" of antebellum lore.

National flags

The first official flag of the Confederate States of America – called the "Stars and Bars" – originally had seven stars, representing the first seven states that initially formed the Confederacy. As more states joined, more stars were added, until the total was 13 (two stars were added for the divided states of Kentucky and Missouri). During the First Battle of Bull Run, (First Manassas) it sometimes proved difficult to distinguish the Stars and Bars from the Union flag. To rectify the situation, a separate "Battle Flag" was designed for use by troops in the field. Also known as the "Southern Cross", many variations sprang from the original square configuration.

Although it was never officially adopted by the Confederate government, the popularity of the Southern Cross among both soldiers and the civilian population was a primary reason why it was made the main color feature when a new national flag was adopted in 1863. This new standard – known as the "Stainless Banner" – consisted of a lengthened white field area with a Battle Flag canton. This flag too had its problems when used in military operations as, on a windless day, it could easily be mistaken for a flag of truce or surrender. Thus, in 1865, a modified version of the Stainless Banner was adopted. This final national flag of the Confederacy kept the Battle Flag canton, but shortened the white field and added a vertical red bar to the fly end.

Because of its depiction in the 20th-century and popular media, many people consider the rectangular battle flag with the dark blue bars as being synonymous with "the Confederate Flag", but this flag was never adopted as a Confederate national flag.

The "Confederate Flag" has a color scheme similar to that of the most common Battle Flag design, but is rectangular, not square. The "Confederate Flag" is a highly recognizable symbol of the South in the United States today, and continues to be a controversial icon.

Southern Unionism

Unionism—opposition to the Confederacy—was strong in certain areas within the Confederate States. Southern Unionists (white Southerners who were opposed to the Confederacy) were widespread in the mountain regions of Appalachia and the Ozarks. Unionists, led by Parson Brownlow and Senator Andrew Johnson, took control of eastern Tennessee in 1863. Unionists also attempted control over western Virginia, but never effectively held more than half of the counties that formed the new state of West Virginia. Union forces captured parts of coastal North Carolina, and at first were largely welcomed by local unionists. That view would change for some, as the occupiers became perceived as oppressive, callous, radical and favorable to Freedmen. Occupiers pillaged, freed slaves, and evicted those who refused to swear loyalty oaths to the Union.

Support for the Confederacy was also low in parts of Texas, where Unionism persisted in certain areas. Claude Elliott estimates that only a third of the population actively supported the Confederacy. Many Unionists supported the Confederacy after the war began, but many others clung to their Unionism throughout the war, especially in the northern counties, German districts in the Texas Hill Country, and majority Mexican areas. According to Ernest Wallace: "This account of a dissatisfied Unionist minority, although historically essential, must be kept in its proper perspective, for throughout the war the overwhelming majority of the people zealously supported the Confederacy ..." Randolph B. Campbell states, "In spite of terrible losses and hardships, most Texans continued throughout the war to support the Confederacy as they had supported secession". Dale Baum in his analysis of Texas politics in the era counters: "This idea of a Confederate Texas united politically against northern adversaries was shaped more by nostalgic fantasies than by wartime realities." He characterizes Texas Civil War history as "a morose story of intragovernmental rivalries coupled with wide-ranging disaffection that prevented effective implementation of state wartime policies".

In Texas, local officials harassed and murdered Unionists and Germans during the Civil War. In Cooke County, Texas, 150 suspected Unionists were arrested; 25 were lynched without trial and 40 more were hanged after a summary trial. Draft resistance was widespread especially among Texans of German or Mexican descent; many of the latter leaving to Mexico. Confederate officials would attempt to hunt down and kill potential draftees who had gone into hiding.

Civil liberties were of small concern in both the North and South. Lincoln and Davis both took a hard line against dissent. Neely explores how the Confederacy became a virtual police state with guards and patrols all about, and a domestic passport system whereby everyone needed official permission each time they wanted to travel. Over 4,000 suspected Unionists were imprisoned in the Confederate States without trial.

Southerner Unionists were also known as Union Loyalists or Lincoln's Loyalists. Within the eleven Confederate states, states such as Tennessee (especially East Tennessee), Virginia (which included West Virginia at the time), and North Carolina were home to the largest populations of Unionists. Many areas of Southern Appalachia harbored pro-Union sentiment as well. As many as 100,000 men living in states under Confederate control would serve in the Union Army or pro-Union guerilla groups. Although Southern Unionists came from all classes, most differed socially, culturally, and economically from the regions dominant pre-war planter class.

Geography

Region and climate
Most of the interior portion consisted of arable farmland, though much was also hilly and mountainous, and the far western territories were deserts. The lower reaches of the Mississippi River bisected the country, with the western half often referred to as the Trans-Mississippi.

Climate

Much of the area claimed by the Confederate States of America had a humid subtropical climate with mild winters and long, hot, humid summers. The climate and terrain varied from vast swamps (such as those in Florida and Louisiana) to semi-arid steppes and arid deserts west of longitude 100 degrees west. The subtropical climate made winters mild but allowed infectious diseases to flourish. Consequently, on both sides more soldiers died from disease than were killed in combat, a fact hardly atypical of pre-World War I conflicts.

Demographics

Population

The United States Census of 1860 gives a picture of the overall 1860 population for the areas that had joined the Confederacy. Note that the population numbers exclude non-assimilated Indian tribes.

In 1860, the areas that later formed the eleven Confederate states (and including the future West Virginia) had 132,760 (1.46%) free blacks. Males made up 49.2% of the total population and females 50.8% (whites: 48.60% male, 51.40% female; slaves: 50.15% male, 49.85% female; free blacks: 47.43% male, 52.57% female).

Rural and urban population

The CSA was overwhelmingly rural. Few towns had populations of more than 1,000 – the typical county seat had a population of fewer than 500. Cities were rare; of the twenty largest U.S. cities in the 1860 census, only New Orleans lay in Confederate territory – and the Union captured New Orleans in 1862. Only 13 Confederate-controlled cities ranked among the top 100 U.S. cities in 1860, most of them ports whose economic activities vanished or suffered severely in the Union blockade. The population of Richmond swelled after it became the Confederate capital, reaching an estimated 128,000 in 1864. Other Southern cities in the border slave-holding states such as Baltimore, Washington, D.C., Wheeling, Alexandria, Louisville, and St. Louis never came under the control of the Confederate government.

The cities of the Confederacy included most prominently in order of size of population:

(See also Atlanta in the Civil War, Charleston, South Carolina, in the Civil War, Nashville in the Civil War, New Orleans in the Civil War, Wilmington, North Carolina, in the American Civil War, and Richmond in the Civil War).

Religion

The CSA was overwhelmingly Protestant. Both free and enslaved populations identified with evangelical Protestantism. Baptists and Methodists together formed majorities of both the white and the slave population (see Black church). Freedom of religion and separation of church and state were fully ensured by Confederate laws. Church attendance was very high and chaplains played a major role in the Army.

Most large denominations experienced a North–South split in the prewar era on the issue of slavery. The creation of a new country necessitated independent structures. For example, the Presbyterian Church in the United States split, with much of the new leadership provided by Joseph Ruggles Wilson (father of President Woodrow Wilson). In 1861, he organized the meeting that formed the General Assembly of the Southern Presbyterian Church and served as its chief executive for 37 years. Baptists and Methodists both broke off from their Northern coreligionists over the slavery issue, forming the Southern Baptist Convention and the Methodist Episcopal Church, South, respectively. Elites in the southeast favored the Protestant Episcopal Church in the Confederate States of America, which had reluctantly split from the Episcopal Church in 1861. Other elites were Presbyterians belonging to the 1861-founded Presbyterian Church in the United States. Catholics included an Irish working class element in coastal cities and an old French element in southern Louisiana. Other insignificant and scattered religious populations included Lutherans, the Holiness movement, other Reformed, other Christian fundamentalists, the Stone-Campbell Restoration Movement, the Churches of Christ, the Latter Day Saint movement, Adventists, Muslims, Jews, Native American animists, deists and irreligious people.

The southern churches met the shortage of Army chaplains by sending missionaries. The Southern Baptists started in 1862 and had a total of 78 missionaries. Presbyterians were even more active with 112 missionaries in January 1865. Other missionaries were funded and supported by the Episcopalians, Methodists, and Lutherans. One result was wave after wave of revivals in the Army.

Military leaders

  

Military leaders of the Confederacy (with their state or country of birth and highest rank) included:

 Robert E. Lee (Virginia) – General & General in Chief
 P. G. T. Beauregard (Louisiana) – General
 Braxton Bragg (North Carolina) – General
 Samuel Cooper (New York) – General
 Albert Sidney Johnston (Kentucky) – General
 Joseph E. Johnston (Virginia) – General
 Edmund Kirby Smith (Florida)General
 Simon Bolivar Buckner, Sr. (Kentucky)Lieutenant General
 Jubal Early (Virginia) – Lieutenant-General
 Richard S. Ewell (Virginia) – Lieutenant-General
 Nathan Bedford Forrest (Tennessee) – Lieutenant-General
 Wade Hampton III (South Carolina) – Lieutenant-General
 William J. Hardee (Georgia)Lieutenant-General
 A. P. Hill (Virginia) – Lieutenant-General
 Theophilus H. Holmes (North Carolina) Lieutenant-General
 John Bell Hood (Kentucky) – Lieutenant-General (temporary General)
 Thomas J. "Stonewall" Jackson (Virginia) – Lieutenant-General
 Stephen D. Lee (South Carolina)Lieutenant-General
 James Longstreet (South Carolina) – Lieutenant-General
 John C. Pemberton (Pennsylvania)Lieutenant-General
 Leonidas Polk (North Carolina) – Lieutenant-General
 Alexander P. Stewart (North Carolina)Lieutenant-General
 Richard Taylor (Kentucky) – Lieutenant-General (son of U.S. President Zachary Taylor)
 Joseph Wheeler (Georgia)Lieutenant-General
 John C. Breckinridge (Kentucky)Major-General & Secretary of War
 Richard H. Anderson (South Carolina)Major-General (temporary Lieutenant-General)
 Patrick Cleburne (County Cork, Ireland) – Major-General
 John Brown Gordon (Georgia)Major-General
 Henry Heth (Virginia)Major-General
 Daniel Harvey Hill (South Carolina)Major-General
 Edward Johnson (Virginia)Major-General
 Joseph B. Kershaw (South Carolina)Major-General
 Fitzhugh Lee (Virginia)Major-General
 George Washington Custis Lee (Virginia)Major-General
 William Henry Fitzhugh Lee (Virginia)Major-General
 William Mahone (Virginia)Major-General
 George Pickett (Virginia)Major-General
 Camillus J. Polignac (France) – Major-General
 Sterling Price (Missouri) – Major-General
 Stephen Dodson Ramseur (North Carolina) – Major-General
 Thomas L. Rosser (Virginia) – Major-General
 J. E. B. Stuart (Virginia) – Major-General
 Earl Van Dorn (Mississippi)Major-General
 John A. Wharton (Tennessee) – Major-General
 Edward Porter Alexander (Georgia) – Brigadier-General
 Francis Marion Cockrell (Missouri) – Brigadier-General
 Clement A. Evans (Georgia)Brigadier-General
 John Hunt Morgan (Kentucky) – Brigadier-General
 William N. Pendleton (Virginia) – Brigadier-General
 Stand Watie (Georgia) – Brigadier-General (last to surrender)
 Lawrence Sullivan Ross (Texas) – Brigadier-General
 John S. Mosby, the "Grey Ghost of the Confederacy" (Virginia) – Colonel
 Franklin Buchanan (Maryland) – Admiral
 Raphael Semmes (Maryland) – Rear Admiral

See also

 American Civil War prison camps
 Cabinet of the Confederate States of America
 Commemoration of the American Civil War
 Commemoration of the American Civil War on postage stamps
 Confederate colonies
 Confederate Patent Office
 Confederate war finance
 C.S.A.: The Confederate States of America
 History of the Southern United States
 Knights of the Golden Circle
 List of Confederate arms manufacturers
 List of Confederate arsenals and armories
 List of Confederate monuments and memorials
 List of treaties of the Confederate States of America
 List of historical separatist movements
 List of civil wars
 National Civil War Naval Museum

Notes

References

 Bowman, John S. (ed), The Civil War Almanac, New York: Bison Books, 1983
 Eicher, John H., & Eicher, David J., Civil War High Commands, Stanford University Press, 2001, 
 Martis, Kenneth C. The Historical Atlas of the Congresses of the Confederate States of America 1861–1865 (1994)

Further reading

Overviews and reference

 American Annual Cyclopaedia for 1861 (N.Y.: Appleton's, 1864), an encyclopedia of events in the U.S. and CSA (and other countries); covers each state in detail
  Appletons' annual cyclopedia and register of important events: Embracing political, military, and ecclesiastical affairs; public documents; biography, statistics, commerce, finance, literature, science, agriculture, and mechanical industry, Volume 3 1863 (1864), thorough coverage of the events of 1863
 Beringer, Richard E., Herman Hattaway, Archer Jones, and William N. Still Jr. Why the South Lost the Civil War. Athens: University of Georgia Press, 1986. .
 Boritt, Gabor S., and others., Why the Confederacy Lost, (1992)
 Coulter, E. Merton The Confederate States of America, 1861–1865, 1950
 Current, Richard N., ed. Encyclopedia of the Confederacy (4 vol), 1993. 1900 pages, articles by scholars.
 
 Eaton, Clement A History of the Southern Confederacy, 1954
 Faust, Patricia L., ed. Historical Times Illustrated History of the Civil War. New York: Harper & Row, 1986. .
 Gallagher, Gary W. The Confederate War. Cambridge, MA: Harvard University Press, 1997. .
 Heidler, David S., and Jeanne T. Heidler, eds. Encyclopedia of the American Civil War: A Political, Social, and Military History. New York: W. W. Norton & Company, 2000. . 2740 pages.
 McPherson, James M. Battle Cry of Freedom: The Civil War Era. Oxford History of the United States. New York: Oxford University Press, 1988. . standard military history of the war; Pulitzer Prize
 Nevins, Allan. The War for the Union. Vol. 1, The Improvised War 1861–1862. New York: Charles Scribner's Sons, 1959. ; The War for the Union. Vol. 2, War Becomes Revolution 1862–1863. New York: Charles Scribner's Sons, 1960. ; The War for the Union. Vol. 3, The Organized War 1863–1864. New York: Charles Scribner's Sons, 1971. ; The War for the Union. Vol. 4, The Organized War to Victory 1864–1865. New York: Charles Scribner's Sons, 1971. . The most detailed history of the war.
 Roland, Charles P. The Confederacy, (1960) brief survey
 
 Thomas, Emory M. The Confederate Nation, 1861–1865. New York: Harper & Row, 1979. . Standard political-economic-social history
 Wakelyn, Jon L. Biographical Dictionary of the Confederacy Greenwood Press 
 Weigley, Russell F. A Great Civil War: A Military and Political History, 1861–1865. Bloomington and Indianapolis: Indiana University Press, 2000. .

Historiography

 
 Boles, John B. and Evelyn Thomas Nolen, eds. Interpreting Southern History: Historiographical Essays in Honor of Sanford W. Higginbotham (1987)
 
 Foote, Lorien. "Rethinking the Confederate home front." Journal of the Civil War Era 7.3 (2017): 446-465 online.
 
 Grant, Susan-Mary, and Brian Holden Reid, eds. The American civil war: explorations and reconsiderations (Longman, 2000.)
 Hettle, Wallace. Inventing Stonewall Jackson: A Civil War Hero in History and Memory (LSU Press, 2011).
 Link, Arthur S. and  Rembert W. Patrick, eds. Writing Southern History: Essays in Historiography in Honor of Fletcher M. Green (1965)
 Sternhell, Yael A. "Revisionism Reinvented? The Antiwar Turn in Civil War Scholarship." Journal of the Civil War Era 3.2 (2013): 239–256 online.
 Woodworth, Steven E. ed. The American Civil War: A Handbook of Literature and Research (1996), 750 pages of historiography and bibliography

State studies

 Tucker, Spencer, ed. American Civil War: A State-by-State Encyclopedia (2 vol 2015) 1019pp

Border states

 Ash, Stephen V. Middle Tennessee society transformed, 1860–1870: war and peace in the Upper South (2006)
 Cooling, Benjamin Franklin. Fort Donelson's Legacy: War and Society in Kentucky and Tennessee, 1862–1863 (1997)
 Cottrell, Steve. Civil War in Tennessee (2001) 142pp
 Crofts, Daniel W. Reluctant Confederates: Upper South Unionists in the Secession Crisis. (1989) .
 Dollar, Kent, and others. Sister States, Enemy States: The Civil War in Kentucky and Tennessee (2009)
 Durham, Walter T. Nashville: The Occupied City, 1862–1863 (1985);  Reluctant Partners: Nashville and the Union, 1863–1865 (1987)
 Mackey, Robert R. The Uncivil War: Irregular Warfare in the Upper South, 1861–1865 (University of Oklahoma Press, 2014)
 Temple, Oliver P. East Tennessee and the civil war (1899) 588pp online edition

Alabama and Mississippi

 Fleming, Walter L. Civil War and Reconstruction in Alabama (1905). the most detailed study; Dunning School full text online from Project Gutenberg
 Rainwater, Percy Lee. Mississippi: storm center of secession, 1856–1861 (1938)
 Rigdon, John. A Guide to Alabama Civil War Research (2011)
 Smith, Timothy B. Mississippi in the Civil War: The Home Front University Press of Mississippi, (2010) 265 pages; Examines the declining morale of Mississippians as they witnessed extensive destruction and came to see victory as increasingly improbable
 Sterkx, H. E. Partners in Rebellion: Alabama Women in the Civil War (Fairleigh Dickinson University Press, 1970)
 Storey, Margaret M. "Civil War Unionists and the Political Culture of Loyalty in Alabama, 1860–1861". Journal of Southern History (2003): 71–106. in JSTOR
 Storey, Margaret M., Loyalty and Loss: Alabama's Unionists in the Civil War and Reconstruction. Baton Rouge: Louisiana State University Press, 2004.
 Towns, Peggy Allen. Duty Driven: The Plight of North Alabama's African Americans During the Civil War (2012)

Florida and Georgia

 DeCredico, Mary A. Patriotism for Profit: Georgia's Urban Entrepreneurs and the Confederate War Effort (1990)
 Fowler, John D. and David B. Parker, eds. Breaking the Heartland: The Civil War in Georgia (2011)
 Hill, Louise Biles. Joseph E. Brown and the Confederacy. (1972); He was the governor
 
 Johns, John Edwin. Florida During the Civil War (University of Florida Press, 1963)
 Johnson, Michael P. Toward A Patriarchal Republic: The Secession of Georgia (1977)
 Mohr, Clarence L. On the Threshold of Freedom: Masters and Slaves in Civil War Georgia (1986)
 Nulty, William H. Confederate Florida: The Road to Olustee (University of Alabama Press, 1994)
 Parks, Joseph H. Joseph E. Brown of Georgia (LSU Press, 1977) 612 pages; Governor
 Wetherington, Mark V. Plain Folk's Fight: The Civil War and Reconstruction in Piney Woods Georgia (2009)

Louisiana, Texas, Arkansas, and West

 Bailey, Anne J., and Daniel E. Sutherland, eds. Civil War Arkansas: beyond battles and leaders (Univ of Arkansas Pr, 2000)
 Ferguson, John Lewis, ed. Arkansas and the Civil War (Pioneer Press, 1965)
 Ripley, C. Peter. Slaves and Freedmen in Civil War Louisiana (LSU Press, 1976)
 Snyder, Perry Anderson. Shreveport, Louisiana, during the Civil War and Reconstruction (1979)
 Underwood, Rodman L. Waters of Discord: The Union Blockade of Texas During the Civil War (McFarland, 2003)
 Winters, John D. The Civil War in Louisiana (LSU Press, 1991)
 Woods, James M. Rebellion and Realignment: Arkansas's Road to Secession. (1987)
 Wooster, Ralph A. Civil War Texas (Texas A&M University Press, 2014)

North and South Carolina

 Barrett, John G. The Civil War in North Carolina (1995)
 Carbone, John S. The Civil War in Coastal North Carolina (2001)
 Cauthen, Charles Edward; Power, J. Tracy. South Carolina goes to war, 1860–1865 (1950)
 Hardy, Michael C. North Carolina in the Civil War (2011)
 Inscoe,  John C. The Heart of Confederate Appalachia: Western North Carolina in the Civil War (2003)
 Lee, Edward J. and Ron Chepesiuk, eds. South Carolina in the Civil War: The Confederate Experience in Letters and Diaries (2004), primary sources
 Miller, Richard F., ed. States at War, Volume 6: The Confederate States Chronology and a Reference Guide for South Carolina in the Civil War (UP of New England, 2018).

Virginia

 Ash, Stephen V. Rebel Richmond: Life and Death in the Confederate Capital (UNC Press, 2019).
 Ayers, Edward L. and others. Crucible of the Civil War: Virginia from Secession to Commemoration (2008)
 Bryan, T. Conn. Confederate Georgia (1953), the standard scholarly survey
 Davis, William C. and James I. Robertson, Jr., eds. Virginia at War 1861. Lexington, KY: University of Kentucky Press, 2005. ; Virginia at War 1862 (2007); Virginia at War 1863 (2009); Virginia at War 1864 (2009);  Virginia at War 1865 (2012)
 Snell, Mark A. West Virginia and the Civil War, Mountaineers Are Always Free, (2011) .
 Wallenstein, Peter, and Bertram Wyatt-Brown, eds. Virginia's Civil War (2008)
 Furgurson, Ernest B. Ashes of Glory: Richmond at War (1997)

Social history, gender

 Bever, Megan L. "Prohibition, Sacrifice, and Morality in the Confederate States, 1861–1865." Journal of Southern History 85.2 (2019): 251–284 online.
 Brown, Alexis Girardin. "The Women Left Behind: Transformation of the Southern Belle, 1840–1880" (2000) Historian 62#4 pp 759–778.
 Cashin, Joan E. "Torn Bonnets and Stolen Silks: Fashion, Gender, Race, and Danger in the Wartime South." Civil War History 61#4 (2015): 338–361. online
 Chesson, Michael B. "Harlots or Heroines? A New Look at the Richmond Bread Riot." Virginia Magazine of History and Biography 92#2 (1984): 131–175. in JSTOR
 Clinton, Catherine, and Silber, Nina, eds. Divided Houses: Gender and the Civil War (1992)
 Davis, William C. and James I. Robertson Jr., eds. Virginia at War, 1865 (2012). 
 Elliot, Jane Evans. Diary of Mrs. Jane Evans Elliot, 1837–1882 (1908)
 Faust, Drew Gilpin. Mothers of Invention: Women of the Slaveholding South in the American Civil War (1996)
 Faust, Drew Gilpin. This Republic of Suffering: Death and the American Civil War (2008)
 Frank, Lisa Tendrich, ed. Women in the American Civil War (2008)
 Frank, Lisa Tendrich. The Civilian War: Confederate Women and Union Soldiers during Sherman's March (LSU Press, 2015).
 Gleeson. David T. The Green and the Gray: The Irish in the Confederate States of America (U of North Carolina Press, 2013); online review
 Glymph, Thavolia. The Women's Fight: The Civil War's Battles for Home, Freedom, and Nation (UNC Press, 2019).
 Hilde, Libra Rose. Worth a Dozen Men: Women and Nursing in the Civil War South (U of Virginia Press, 2012).
 Levine, Bruce. The Fall of the House of Dixie: The Civil War and the Social Revolution That Transformed the South (2013)
 Lowry, Thomas P. The Story the Soldiers Wouldn't Tell: Sex in the Civil War (Stackpole Books, 1994).
 Massey, Mary. Bonnet Brigades: American Women and the Civil War (1966), excellent overview North and South; reissued as Women in the Civil War (1994)
"Bonnet Brigades at Fifty: Reflections on Mary Elizabeth Massey and Gender in Civil War History," Civil War History (2015) 61#4 pp 400–444.
 Massey, Mary Elizabeth. Refugee Life in the Confederacy, (1964)
 
 Rable, George C. Civil Wars: Women and the Crisis of Southern Nationalism (1989)
 Slap, Andrew L. and Frank Towers, eds. Confederate Cities: The Urban South during the Civil War Era  (U of Chicago Press, 2015). 302 pp.
 Stokes, Karen. South Carolina Civilians in Sherman's Path: Stories of Courage Amid Civil War Destruction (The History Press, 2012).
 Strong, Melissa J. "'The Finest Kind of Lady': Hegemonic Femininity in American Women’s Civil War Narratives." Women's Studies 46.1 (2017): 1–21 online.
 Swanson, David A., and Richard R. Verdugo. "The Civil War’s Demographic Impact on White Males in the Eleven Confederate States: An Analysis by State and Selected Age Groups." Journal of Political & Military Sociology 46.1 (2019): 1–26.
 Whites, LeeAnn. The Civil War as a Crisis in Gender: Augusta, Georgia, 1860–1890 (1995)
 Wiley, Bell Irwin Confederate Women (1975) online
 Wiley, Bell Irwin The Plain People of the Confederacy (1944) online
 Woodward, C. Vann, ed. Mary Chesnut's Civil War, 1981, detailed diary; primary source

African Americans
 Andrews, William L. Slavery and Class in the American South: A Generation of Slave Narrative Testimony, 1840–1865 (Oxford UP, 2019).
 Ash, Stephen V. The Black Experience in the Civil War South (2010). 
 Bartek, James M. "The Rhetoric of Destruction: Racial Identity and Noncombatant Immunity in the Civil War Era." (PhD Dissertation, University of Kentucky, 2010).  online; Bibliography pp. 515–52.
 Frankel, Noralee. Freedom's Women: Black Women and Families in Civil War Era Mississippi (1999).
 Lang, Andrew F. In the Wake of War: Military Occupation, Emancipation, and Civil War America (LSU Press, 2017).
 Levin, Kevin M. Searching for Black Confederates: The Civil War’s Most Persistent Myth (UNC Press, 2019).
 Litwack, Leon F. Been in the Storm So Long: The Aftermath of Slavery (1979), on freed slaves
 Reidy, Joseph P. Illusions of Emancipation: The Pursuit of Freedom and Equality in the Twilight of Slavery (UNC Press, 2019).
 Wiley, Bell Irwin Southern Negroes: 1861–1865 (1938)

Soldiers
 Broomall, James J. Private Confederacies: The Emotional Worlds of Southern Men as Citizens and Soldiers (UNC Press, 2019).
 Donald, David. "The Confederate as a Fighting Man." Journal of Southern History 25.2 (1959): 178–193. online
 Faust, Drew Gilpin. "Christian Soldiers: The Meaning of Revivalism in the Confederate Army." Journal of Southern History 53.1 (1987): 63–90 online.
 McNeill, William J. "A Survey of Confederate Soldier Morale During Sherman's Campaign Through Georgia and the Carolinas." Georgia Historical Quarterly 55.1 (1971): 1–25.
 Scheiber, Harry N. "The Pay of Confederate Troops and Problems of Demoralization: A Case of Administrative Failure." Civil War History 15.3 (1969): 226–236 online. 
 Sheehan-Dean, Aaron. Why Confederates Fought: Family and Nation in Civil War Virginia (U of North Carolina Press, 2009).
 Watson, Samuel J. "Religion and combat motivation in the Confederate armies." Journal of Military History 58.1 (1994): 29+.
 Wiley, Bell Irwin. The life of Johnny Reb; the common soldier of the Confederacy (1971) online
 Wooster, Ralph A., and Robert Wooster. "'Rarin'for a Fight': Texans in the Confederate Army." Southwestern Historical Quarterly 84.4 (1981): 387–426 online.

Intellectual history

 Bernath, Michael T. Confederate Minds: The Struggle for Intellectual Independence in the Civil War South (University of North Carolina Press; 2010) 412 pages. Examines the efforts of writers, editors, and other "cultural nationalists" to free the South from the dependence on Northern print culture and educational systems.
 Bonner, Robert E., "Proslavery Extremism Goes to War: The Counterrevolutionary Confederacy and Reactionary Militarism", Modern Intellectual History, 6 (August 2009), 261–85.
 Downing, David C. A South Divided: Portraits of Dissent in the Confederacy. (2007). 
 Faust, Drew Gilpin. The Creation of Confederate Nationalism: Ideology and Identity in the Civil War South. (1988)
 Hutchinson, Coleman. Apples and Ashes: Literature, Nationalism, and the Confederate States of America. Athens, Georgia: University of Georgia Press, 2012.
 Lentz, Perry Carlton Our Missing Epic: A Study in the Novels about the American Civil War, 1970
 Rubin, Anne Sarah. A Shattered Nation: The Rise and Fall of the Confederacy, 1861–1868, 2005 A cultural study of Confederates' self images

Political history

 Alexander, Thomas B., and Beringer, Richard E. The Anatomy of the Confederate Congress: A Study of the Influences of Member Characteristics on Legislative Voting Behavior, 1861–1865, (1972)
 Cooper, William J, Jefferson Davis, American (2000), standard biography
 Davis, William C. A Government of Our Own: The Making of the Confederacy. New York: The Free Press, a division of Macmillan, Inc., 1994. .
 Eckenrode, H. J., Jefferson Davis: President of the South, 1923
 Levine, Bruce. Confederate Emancipation: Southern Plans to Free and Arm Slaves during the Civil War. (2006)
 Martis, Kenneth C., "The Historical Atlas of the Congresses of the Confederate States of America 1861–1865" (1994) 
 Neely, Mark E. Jr., Confederate Bastille: Jefferson Davis and Civil Liberties (1993)
 Neely, Mark E. Jr. Southern Rights: Political Prisoners and the Myth of Confederate Constitutionalism. (1999) 
 George C. Rable The Confederate Republic: A Revolution against Politics, 1994
 Rembert, W. Patrick Jefferson Davis and His Cabinet (1944).
 Williams, William M. Justice in Grey: A History of the Judicial System of the Confederate States of America (1941)
 Yearns, Wilfred Buck The Confederate Congress (1960)

Foreign affairs

 Blumenthal, Henry. "Confederate Diplomacy: Popular Notions and International Realities", Journal of Southern History, Vol. 32, No. 2 (May 1966), pp. 151–171 in JSTOR
 Cleland, Beau. "The Confederate States of America and the British Empire: Neutral Territory and Civil Wars." Journal of Military and Strategic Studies 16.4 (2016): 171–181. online
 Daddysman, James W. The Matamoros Trade: Confederate Commerce, Diplomacy, and Intrigue. (1984) online
 Foreman, Amanda. A World on Fire: Britain's Crucial Role in the American Civil War (2011) especially on Brits inside the Confederacy;
 Hubbard, Charles M. The Burden of Confederate Diplomacy (1998)
 Jones, Howard. Blue and Gray Diplomacy: A History of Union and Confederate Foreign Relations (2009) online
 Jones, Howard. Union in Peril: The Crisis Over British Intervention in the Civil War. Lincoln, NE: University of Nebraska Press, Bison Books, 1997. . Originally published: Chapel Hill: University of North Carolina Press, 1992.
 Mahin, Dean B. One War at a Time: The International Dimensions of the American Civil War. Washington, DC: Brassey's, 2000. . Originally published: Washington, DC: Brassey's, 1999.
 Merli, Frank J. The Alabama, British Neutrality, and the American Civil War (2004). 225 pages.
 Owsley, Frank. King Cotton Diplomacy: Foreign Relations of the Confederate States of America (2nd ed. 1959) online
 Sainlaude, Steve. France and the American Civil War: A Diplomatic History (2019)  excerpt

Economic history

 Black, III, Robert C. The Railroads of the Confederacy. Chapel Hill: University of North Carolina Press, 1952, 1988. .
 Bonner, Michael Brem. "Expedient Corporatism and Confederate Political Economy", Civil War History, 56 (March 2010), 33–65.
 Dabney, Virginius Richmond: The Story of a City. Charlottesville: The University of Virginia Press, 1990 
 Grimsley, Mark The Hard Hand of War: Union Military Policy toward Southern Civilians, 1861–1865, 1995
 Hurt, R. Douglas.  Agriculture and the Confederacy: Policy, Productivity, and Power in the Civil War South (2015)
 Massey, Mary Elizabeth Ersatz in the Confederacy: Shortages and Substitutes on the Southern Homefront (1952)
 Paskoff, Paul F. "Measures of War: A Quantitative Examination of the Civil War's Destructiveness in the Confederacy", Civil War History (2008) 54#1 pp 35–62 in Project MUSE
 Ramsdell, Charles. Behind the Lines in the Southern Confederacy, 1994.
 Roark, James L. Masters without Slaves: Southern Planters in the Civil War and Reconstruction, 1977.
 Thomas, Emory M. The Confederacy as a Revolutionary Experience, 1992

Primary sources

 Carter, Susan B., ed. The Historical Statistics of the United States: Millennial Edition (5 vols), 2006
 Commager, Henry Steele. The Blue and the Gray: The Story of the Civil War As Told by Participants. 2 vols. Indianapolis and New York: The Bobbs-Merrill Company, Inc., 1950. . Many reprints.
 Davis, Jefferson. The Rise of the Confederate Government. New York: Barnes & Noble, 2010. Original edition: 1881. .
 Davis, Jefferson. The Fall of the Confederate Government. New York: Barnes & Noble, 2010. Original edition: 1881. .
 Harwell, Richard B., The Confederate Reader (1957)
 Hettle, Wallace, ed. The Confederate Homefront: A History in Documents (LSU Press, 2017) 214 pages
 Jones, John B. A Rebel War Clerk's Diary at the Confederate States Capital, edited by Howard Swiggert, [1935] 1993. 2 vols.
 Richardson, James D., ed. A Compilation of the Messages and Papers of the Confederacy, Including the Diplomatic Correspondence 1861–1865, 2 volumes, 1906.
 Yearns, W. Buck and Barret, John G., eds. North Carolina Civil War Documentary, 1980.
 Confederate official government documents major online collection of complete texts in HTML format, from University of North Carolina
 Journal of the Congress of the Confederate States of America, 1861–1865 (7 vols), 1904. Available online at the Library of Congress0

External links

 Confederate offices Index of Politicians by Office Held or Sought
 Civil War Research & Discussion Group -*Confederate States of Am. Army and Navy Uniforms, 1861
 The Countryman, 1862–1866, published weekly by Turnwold, Ga., edited by J.A. Turner
 The Federal and the Confederate Constitution Compared
 
 Confederate Postage Stamps 
 Photographs of the original Confederate Constitution  and other Civil War documents owned by the Hargrett Rare Book and Manuscript Library  at the University of Georgia Libraries.
 Photographic History of the Civil War, 10 vols., 1912.
 DocSouth: Documenting the American South – numerous online text, image, and audio collections.
 The Boston Athenæum has over 4000 Confederate imprints, including rare books, pamphlets, government documents, manuscripts, serials, broadsides, maps, and sheet music that have been conserved and digitized.
 Oklahoma Digital Maps: Digital Collections of Oklahoma and Indian Territory
 Confederate States of America Collection at the Library of Congress
Religion in the CSA: Confederate Veteran Magazine, May, 1922
 
 
 

 
1861 establishments in North America
1865 disestablishments in North America
Federal constitutional republics
Former confederations
Former countries of the United States
Former regions and territories of the United States
Former unrecognized countries
History of the Southern United States

Separatism in the United States
Slavery in the United States
States and territories established in 1861
States and territories disestablished in 1865